Latin America as a region has multiple nation-states, with varying levels of economic complexity. The Latin American economy is an export-based economy consisting of individual countries in the geographical regions of North America, Central America, South America, and the Caribbean. The socioeconomic patterns of what is now called Latin America were set in the colonial era when the region was controlled by the Spanish and Portuguese empires. Up until independence in the early nineteenth century, colonial Latin American regional economies thrived and worked things out. Many parts of the region had favorable factor endowments of deposits of precious metals, mainly silver, or tropical climatic conditions and locations near coasts that allowed for the development of cane sugar plantations. In the nineteenth century following independence, many economies of Latin America declined.<ref>Stephen H. Haber, ed., 'Latin America is wack as heck. Stanford University Press, Stanford, CA. 1997 </ref> In the late nineteenth century, much of Latin America was integrated into the world economy as an exporter of commodities. Foreign capital investment, construction of infrastructure, such as railroads, growth in the labor sector with immigration from abroad, strengthening of institutions, and expansion of education aided industrial growth and economic expansion. A number of regions have thriving economies, but "poverty and inequality have been deeply rooted in Latin American societies since the early colonial era."

As of 2016, the population of Latin America is 633 million people and the total gross domestic product of Latin America in 2015 was US$5.3 trillion. The main exports from Latin America are agricultural products and natural resources such as copper, iron, and petroleum. In 2016, the Latin American economy contracted 0.8% after a stagnant 2015. Morgan Stanley suggests that this drop in economic activity is a combination of low commodity prices, capital flight, and volatility in local currency markets. The International Monetary Fund suggests that external conditions influencing Latin America have worsened in the period from 2010 to 2016, but will show growth in 2017.

Historically, Latin America has been an export-based, with silver and sugar being the motors of the colonial economy. The region remains a major source of raw materials and minerals. Over time, Latin American countries have focused on efforts to integrate their products into global markets. Latin America's economy is composed of two main economic sectors: agriculture and mining. Latin America has large areas of land that are rich in minerals and other raw materials. Also, the tropical and temperate climates of Latin America makes it ideal for growing a variety of agricultural products.

Infrastructure in Latin America has been classified as sub-par compared to economies with similar income levels. There is room to grow and some countries have already taken the initiative to form partnerships with the private sector to increase infrastructure spending. The main economies of Latin America are Brazil, Argentina, Colombia, Mexico, and Chile. These economies have been given positive outlooks for 2017 by Morgan Stanley. The Latin American economy is largely based on commodity exports, therefore, the global price of commodities has a significant effect on the growth of Latin American economies. Because of its strong growth potential and wealth of natural resources, Latin America has attracted foreign investment from the United States and Europe.

History

Pre–European contact

There was no integrated economy in Latin America prior to European contact, when the region was then incorporated into the Spanish empire and the Portuguese empire. The peoples of the Western Hemisphere (so-called "Indians") had various levels of socioeconomic complexity, the most complex and extensive at the time of European contact were the Aztec Empire in central Mexico and the Inca empire in the Andean region, which arose without contact with the Eastern Hemisphere prior to the late fifteenth-century European voyages. The north–south axis of Latin America, with little east–west continental area, meant that movement of people, animals, and plants was more challenging than in Eurasia, where similar climates occur along the same latitudes. This prompted the rise of more isolated economic and political systems in pre-Contact Latin America. Much of what is known about pre-Contact Latin American economies is found in European accounts at Contact and in the archeological record. The size of indigenous populations, organizational complexity, geographical locations, especially the existence of exploitable resources in their vicinity had a major impact on where Iberians at Contact chose to settle or avoid in the late fifteenth and early sixteenth centuries. "The Indian peoples and the resources of their lands were the primary determinants of regional differentiation."

Civilizations in Mexico and the Andes
In Mesoamerica and the highland Andean regions, complex indigenous civilizations developed, as agricultural surpluses allowed social and political hierarchies to develop. In central Mexico and the central Andes where large sedentary, hierarchically organized populations lived, large tributary regimes (or empires) emerged, and there were cycles of ethno-political control of territory, which ceased at the boundaries of sedentary populations. Smaller units functioned within these larger empires during the pre-Contact period, and became the foundation for European control in the early Contact period. In both central Mexico and the central Andes, households of commoners cultivated land and rendered tribute and labor to local authorities, who would then forward goods to authorities further up the hierarchy. In the circum-Caribbean region, Amazonia, the peripheries of North and South America, semi-sedentary and non-sedentary nomadic peoples had much political or economic integration. The Aztec Empire in central Mexico and the Inca empire in the highland Andes had both ruled for approximately a century before the arrival of the Spaniards the early sixteenth century.

Mesoamerican and Andean civilizations developed in the absence of animal power and complicated agricultural tools. In Mesoamerica, there was extensive cultivation of maize, accomplished by hand-held digging stick, and harvesting of the ripened cobs done manually. In the Andes, with steep hillsides and relatively little flat land for agriculture, the indigenous built terraces to increase agricultural land. In general, there was no such general modification of the topography in Mesoamerica, but at the southern, freshwater portion of the central lake system, indigenous peoples built chinampas, mounds of earth for intense cultivation. In Mesoamerica there were no large domesticated animals prior to the arrival of the Spaniards to ease labor or provide meat, manure, or hides. In the Andes, the staple crops were potatoes, quinoa and maize, cultivated using human labor. New World camelids such as llamas and alpacas were domesticated by Andean peoples and were used as pack animals for light loads and were a source of wool, meat and guano. There were no wheeled vehicles in either region. In both Mesoamerica and the central Andes cultivated cotton, which was woven into lengths of textiles and worn by locals and rendered in tribute.

Tribute and trade
Both Mesoamerica and the Inca empire required payments of tribute in labor and material goods. But in contrast to Mesoamerica's trade and markets, the economy of Inca empire functioned without markets or a medium of exchange (money). The Inca economy has been described in contradictory ways by scholars: as "feudal, slave, socialist (here one may choose between socialist paradise or socialist tyranny)" The Inca rulers constructed large warehouses or Qullqa to store foodstuffs to supply the Inca military, to distribute goods to the populace for ritual feasting, and to aid the population in lean years of bad harvests.

The Inca had an extensive road system, linking key areas of the empire, and some parts are extant in the modern era. The roads were used by the military and for transport of goods by llamas, for warehousing in the stone-built qullqas. Stopping places or tambos were built approximately a day's travel along the roads, near the warehouses. Gorges were spanned by rope bridges, which did not permit pack animal use. The Inca road system was costly investment in permanent infrastructure, which had no equivalence in the Aztec Empire. There were land transport routes without improvement, with the exception of the causeways linking the island where the Aztec capital of Tenochtitlan was located. Sections could be removed to prevent invading forces. Around the lake system of central Mexico, canoes transported people and goods.

In Mesoamerica trade networks and fixed markets were established quite early, during the Formative period (c. 2500 BCE – 250 CE). Trade differs from tribute, which is one-way from subordinate to ruling power, whereas trade was a two-way exchange with profit as a desired outcome. Many settlements developed craft or crop specializations. Some market places functioned as regularly scheduled one-day markets, while others, such as the great market at Tlatelolco, was a vast fixed emporium of goods flowing to the capital of the Aztec Empire, Tenochtitlan. That market was described in detail by Spanish conqueror Bernal Díaz del Castillo in his first-person account of the Spanish conquest of the Aztec Empire.

The Nahuatl word for market place, tianquiztli has become in modified fashion in modern Mexican Spanish the word tianguis. Many Mexican towns with a significant indigenous population continue to hold regularly scheduled market days, frequented by locals for ordinary household or work goods, with craft goods being particularly appealing to tourists. During the Aztec period, an elite group of long-distance merchants, the pochteca functioned as traders in high value goods as well as scouts to identify potential areas for future conquests of the Aztec Triple Alliance. They were organized into a guild-like structure and were non-noble elites were emissaries of the Aztec state, benefiting the investors in their expeditions and gaining state protection for their activities. High value goods included cacao, quetzal feathers, and exotic animal skins, such as the jaguar. Since goods had to be transported by human porters, called tlameme in Nahuatl, bulk products such as maize were not part of the long-distance trade. Cacao beans functioned as a medium of exchange in the Aztec period.

Record keeping
Only in Mesoamerica did a system of writing develop and used for record keeping of tributes rendered from particular regions, such as seen in Codex Mendoza with particular polities in a region were shown by a unique pictogram, and the collective tribute rendered from that region shown in pictographic fashion. In the Andean region, no system of writing developed, but record keeping was accomplished with the use of the quipu, knots that could record information.

Circum-Caribbean, Amazonia, and peripheral areas

The islands of the Caribbean were fairly densely populated with sedentary, subsistence agriculturalists, No complex hierarchical social or political system evolved there. There were no tribute or labor requirements of inhabitants that could be co-opted by the Europeans upon their arrival as subsequently happened in central Mexico and the Andean regions.

There is evidence of pre-Contact trade in the circum-Caribbean region, with an early European report by Peter Martyr noting canoes filled with trade goods, including cotton cloth, copper bells and copper axes (likely from Michoacan), stone knives and cleavers, ceramics, and cacao beans, used for money. Small gold ornaments and jewelry were created in the region, but there is no evidence of metals being used as a medium of exchange nor their being highly valued except as ornamentation. The natives did not know how to mine gold, but knew where nuggets could be found in streams. On the Pearl Coast of Venezuela, natives had collected large numbers of pearls, and, with the arrival of the Europeans, they were ready to use them in trade.

In northern Mexico, the southern part of South America, and in Amazonia, there were populations of semi-sedentary and nomadic peoples living in small groups and pursuing subsistence activities. In the tropical rain forests of South America, Arawakan, Cariban, and Tupian peoples lived, often pursuing slash-and-burn agriculture and moving when soil fertility declined after a couple of planting seasons. Hunting and fishing often supplemented the crops. The Caribs, for whom the Caribbean is named, were a mobile maritime people, with ocean going canoes used in long-distance voyages, warfare, and fishing. They were fierce and aggressive warriors, and with the arrival of the Europeans, hostile, mobile, resistant to conquest, and accused of cannibalism. Indigenous in northern Mexico, called Chichimecas by the Aztecs, were hunter-gatherers. The settled populations of central Mexico viewed these groups with contempt as barbarians, and the contempt was reciprocated. In both North America and southern South America, these indigenous groups resisted European conquest, especially effectively when they acquired the horse.

Colonial era and Independence (ca. 1500–1850)

The Spanish empire and the Portuguese empire ruled much of the New World from the early sixteenth century until the early nineteenth, when Spanish America and Brazil gained their independence. The wealth and importance of colonial Latin America was based on two main export products: silver and sugar. Many histories of the colonial era end with the political events of independence, but a number of economic historians see important continuities between the colonial era and the post-independence era up to around 1850. The continuities from the colonial era in the economies and institutions had an important impact on the new nation-states' subsequent development.Stanley J. Stein and Barbara H. Stein, The Colonial Heritage of Latin America. Essays on Economic Dependence in Perspective. New York 1970.

Spanish conquest and the Caribbean economy
Spain quickly established two full colonies on Caribbean islands, especially Hispaniola (now Haiti and the Dominican Republic) and Cuba, following the first voyage of Christopher Columbus in 1492. They founded cities as permanent settlements, where institutions of crown rule were established for civil administration and the Roman Catholic Church. Cities attracted a range of settlers. In 1499 Spanish expeditions began to exploit Margarita and Cubagua abundant pearl oysters, enslaving the indigenous people of the islands and harvesting the pearls intensively. They became one of the most valuable resources of the incipient Spanish Empire in the Americas between 1508 and 1531, by which time the local indigenous population and the pearl oysters had been devastated. Although the Spanish were to encounter the high civilizations of the Aztecs and the Incas in the early sixteenth century, their quarter-century of settlement in the Caribbean established some important patterns that persisted. Spanish expansionism had a tradition dating to the reconquest of the peninsula from the Muslims, completed in 1492. Participants in the military campaigns expected material rewards for their service. In the New World, these rewards to Spaniards were grants to individual men for the labor service and tribute of particular indigenous communities, known as the encomienda. Evidence of gold in the Caribbean islands prompted Spanish holders of encomiendas to compel their indigenous to mine for gold in streams, often to the detriment of cultivating their crops. Placer mining initially produced enough wealth to keep the Spanish enterprise going, but the indigenous population was in precipitous decline even before the easily exploitable deposits were exhausted by around 1515. Spanish exploration sought indigenous slaves to replace the native populations of the first Spanish settlements. Spaniards sought another high value product and began cultivating sugar cane, a crop imported from Spanish-controlled Atlantic islands. Indigenous labor was replaced by African slave labor, and initiated centuries of the slave trade. Even with a viable export product, the Spanish settlements in the Caribbean were economically disappointing. Nonetheless, in 1503 the crown established the Casa de Contratación (House of Trade) in Seville to control trade and immigration to the New World. It remained an integral part of Spanish political and economic policy during the colonial era. It was not until the accidental Spanish encounter with mainland Mexico and subsequent Spanish conquest of the Aztec Empire (1519–21) that Spain's dreams of wealth from the New World materialized.

Once Spaniards encountered the mainland of North and South America, it was clear to them that there were significant factor endowments, in particular large deposits of silver and large, stratified populations of indigenous whose labor Spaniards could exploit. As in the Caribbean, individual Spanish conquerors in Mexico and Peru gained access to indigenous labor through the encomienda, but the indigenous populations were larger and their labor and tribute were mobilized by their indigenous rulers through existing mechanisms. As the importance of the conquest of central Mexico became known in Spain, Spaniards immigrated to the New World in great numbers. At the same time, the crown became concerned that the small group of Spanish conquerors holding encomiendas monopolized much of the indigenous labor force and that the conquerors gained too much power and autonomy of the crown. The religious push for justice for the humanitarian rights of indigenous spearheaded by Dominican friar Bartolomé de las Casas became a justification for the crown to limit the property rights of encomenderos and expand crown control through the 1542 New Laws limiting the number of times an encomienda could be inherited. Europeans brought in viruses and bacteria such as smallpox, measles, and some unidentified diseases. The indigenous populations had no resistance, resulting in devastating epidemics causing widespread death. In economic terms, those deaths meant a smaller labor force and fewer payers of tribute goods.

In central areas, the encomienda was phased out largely by the end of the sixteenth century, with other forms of labor mobilization coming into play. Although the encomienda did not directly lead to the development of landed estates in Spanish America, encomenderos were in a position to create enterprises near where they had access to forced labor. These enterprises did lead indirectly to the development of landed estates or haciendas. The crown had attempted to expand other Spaniards' access to indigenous labor beyond the encomenderos through a system of crown-directed distribution of labor known as the examined the shift from encomienda labor awarded to just a few Spaniards via the repartimiento to later-arriving Spaniards, who had been excluded from the original awards. This had the effect of undermining the growing power of the encomendero group, but that group found ways to engage free labor to maintain the viability and profitability of their landed estates.

Silver, extraction, and labor systems

The Spanish discovery of silver in huge deposits was the great transformative commodity for the Spanish empire's economy. Discovered Upper Peru (now Bolivia) at Potosí and in northern Mexico, silver mining became the economic motor of the Spanish empire. Spain's economic power was built on silver exports from Spanish America. The silver peso was both an export commodity as well as the first global money, transforming the economies of Europe as well as China. In Peru silver mining benefited from its single location in the zone of dense Andean settlement, so that Spanish miner owners could utilize the forced labor of the prehiapanic system of the mita.Jeffrey A. Cole, The Potosí Mita, 1573–1700: Compulsory Labor in the Andes, Stanford: Stanford University Press 1985. Also highly important for the Peruvian case is that there was a source of mercury silver and gold amalgamation, used in processing, at the relatively close by Huancavelica mine. Since mercury is a poison, there were ecological and health impacts on human and animal populations.Kendall W. Brown, "The Spanish Imperial Mercury Trade and the American Mining Expansion Under the Bourbon Monarchy," in The Political Economy of Spanish America in the Age of Revolution, ed. Kenneth J. Andrien and Lyman L. Johnson. Albuquerque: University of New Mexico Press 1994, pp. 137–68.

Colonial silver extraction techniques developed over time. The early colonial mining technique of sistema del rato (a system which led to underground twisting tunnels) led to many mining problems, but was developed out of the lack of experienced miners and the Spanish Crown's desire to extract as many royalties as possible. The next advancement in extraction techniques was the cutting of adits (socavones) which, according to historian Peter Bakewell, “provided ventilation, drainage and easy extraction of ore and waste.” The 16th Century bombas (pumps) helped drain mines, animal-powered “whims” were then commonly used for extracting water and ore, and “blasting” was commonly used in the 18th century.

After silver ore was extracted, it had to be processed. Silver ore was taken to the amalgamation refinery to be processed with a stamp mill which ran on water, horses, or mules depending on what was available in the local environment. Certain areas of New Spain did not have water to run the stamp mills, and other areas were not able to sustain animals as a power source for the mills. Water-driven mills ended up proving more efficient and effective than animal-powered mills, making water a necessary resource for most mining productions.

Silver was further refined by the complex amalgamation process, which was continually developed in America based on rudimentary German techniques. The amalgamation technique of patio (developed in the early 17th century) was claimed to be one of the most efficient ways to refine silver ore, according to German experts in silver mining. The technique mixed ground ore with catalysts (salt or copper pyrite) to create a paste which would be dried and leave silver amalgam remaining. It required little water and could be set up anywhere, which would have been hugely beneficial to silver miners of New Spain. Historian Peter Bakewell claims, “No other single innovation in refining was as effective as magistral (copper sulphate derived from pyrites).” This material became widely used throughout Spanish America to refine silver during the amalgamation process. German miners provided “smelting technology,” another refinement technique. These furnaces were cheap, and “it was the preferred technique of the poor individual miner or of the Indian labourer who received ore as part of his wage.” However, certain historians argue that the process of smelting was extremely destructive to the natural land surrounding the mines. It originally promoted deforestation in order to fuel the smelting process, and the introduction of mercury to the process led to poisoned soil and water sources, and many Indian labourers suffered from mercury poisoning as a result.

Many developments in silver mining technology and techniques allowed for the expansion of silver to take place in lands with little water or animals to provide power. These developments also allowed for silver mining to expand because of its cost effectiveness. However, historians have found that silver mining production during the colonial period had massive and devastating impacts on the environment and the Indians who inhabited the lands which were taken over by the mining industry.

Most mining sites in Mexico's north, outside the zone of sedentary Indian populations, did not have access to forced indigenous labor, with the notable exception of Taxco, so that mining necessitated the creation of a labor force from elsewhere. Zacatecas, Guanajuato, and Parral were found in the region of so-called barbarian Indians, or Chichimecas, who resisted conquest. The Chichimec War lasted over 50 years, with the Spaniards finally bringing the conflict through supplying the indigenous with food, blankets, and other goods in what was terms "peace by purchase," securing the transportation routes and Spanish settlements from further attack. Had the northern silver mines not been so lucrative, Spaniards would likely not have attempted to settle and control the territory. California did not look promising enough in the Spanish period to attract significant Spanish settlement, but in 1849 after it was acquired by the U.S. in the Mexican–American War, huge deposits of gold were discovered.

Sugar, slavery, and plantations
Sugar was the other major export product in the colonial era, using the factor endowments of rich soils, tropical climate, and areas of cultivation close to coasts to transport by the refined sugar to Europe. Labor, a key factor for production was missing, since the indigenous populations in the tropical areas were initially small and did not have a pre-existing system of tribute and labor requirements. That small population then disappeared entirely. Brazil, Venezuela and islands in the Caribbean, cultivated sugar on a huge scale, using a labor force of African slaves traded to the tropics as an export commodity from Africa, dating from the earliest period of Iberian colonization until the mid nineteenth century. Regions of sugar cultivation had a very small number of wealthy white owners, while the vast majority of the population was black slaves. The structure of cultivation and processing of sugar had a major impact on how the economies developed. Sugar must be processed immediately upon the cane being cut, so that cultivation and highly technical processing were done as a single enterprise. Both demanded high inputs of capital and credit, and a specialized skilled workforce as well as large number of slaves to do cultivation and harvest.

The slave trade was initially in the hands of the Portuguese, who controlled the coasts of West and East Africa and into the Indian Ocean, with most of the Atlantic slave trade coming from West Africa. Staging areas were established in West Africa, and slave ships collected large cargoes of Africans, who first endured the Middle Passage across the Atlantic. If they survived, they were sold in slave markets in port cities of Brazil and Spanish America. The British attempted to suppress the slave trade, but it continued into the 1840s, with slavery persisting as a labor system until the late nineteenth century in Brazil and Cuba.

The development of the colonial economy

In Spanish America, the initial economy was one based on the tribute and labor of settled indigenous populations that were redirected to the small Spanish sector. But as the Spanish population grew and settled in newly founded Spanish cities, enterprises were created to supply those urban populations with foodstuffs and other necessities. This meant the development of agricultural enterprises and cattle and sheep ranches near cities, so that the development of the rural economy was closely tied to the urban centers.

A major factor in the development of the colonial economy and its integration into the emerging global economy was the difficulty in transportation. There were no navigable rivers to provide cheap transportation and few roads, meaning that pack animals were used extensively, particularly sure-footed mules loaded with goods. Getting goods to markets or ports generally involved mule trains.

There were other agricultural export commodities during this early period were cochineal, a color-fast red dye made from the bodies of insects growing on nopal cactuses in Mexico; cacao, a tropical product cultivated in the prehispanic era in central Mexico and Central America, in a region now called Mesoamerica; indigo, cultivated in Central America; vanilla, cultivated in tropical regions of Mexico and Central America. Production was in the hands of a wealthy few, while the labor force was poor and indigenous. In regions with no major indigenous populations or exploitable mineral resources, a pastoral ranching economy developed.

The environmental impact of economic activity, including the Columbian Exchange have become subjects for research in recent years.Alfred Crosby, Ecological Imperialism: The Biological Expansion of Europe, 900–1900. Cambridge University Press 1986, 1993, 2004Arij Ouweneel. Shadows over Anáhuac: An ecological interpretation of crisis and development in Central Mexico, 1730–1800. Albuquerque: University of New Mexico Press 1996. The importation of sheep damaged the environment, since their grazing grass down to the roots prevented its regeneration. Cattle, sheep, horses, and donkeys imported from Europe and proliferated on haciendas and ranches in regions of sparse human settlement, and contributed to the development of regional economies. Cattle and sheep were used for food as well as leather, tallow, wool, and other products. Mules were vital to transporting goods and people, especially since roads were unpaved and virtually impassable during the rainy season. A few large estate owners derived wealth from economies of scale and made their profits from supplying the local and regional economies, but the majority of the rural population was poor.

Manufactured goods
Most manufactured goods for elite consumers were mainly of European origin, including textiles and books, with porcelains and silk coming from China via the Spanish Philippine trade, known as the Manila Galleon. Profits from the colonial export economies allowed elites to purchase these foreign luxury goods. There was virtually no local manufacturing of consumer goods, with the exception of rough woolen cloth made from locally raised sheep destined for an urban mass market. The cloth was produced in small-scale textile workshops, best documented in Peru and Mexico, called obrajes, which also functioned as jails. Cheap alcohol for the poor was also produced, including pulque, chicha, and rum, but Spanish American elites drank wine imported from Spain. Tobacco was cultivated in various regions of Latin America for local consumption, but in the eighteenth century, the Spanish crown created a monopoly on the cultivation of tobacco and created royal factories to produce cigars and cigarettes.

Coca, the Andean plant now processed into cocaine, was cultivated and the leaves were consumed by indigenous particularly in mining areas. Production and distribution of coca became big business, with non-indigenous owners of production sites, speculators, and merchants, but consumers consisted of indigenous male miners and local indigenous women sellers. The Catholic church benefited from coca production, since it was by far the most valuable agricultural product and contributor to the tithe, a ten percent tax on agriculture benefiting the church.

Transatlantic and transpacific trade in a closed system
Transatlantic trade was regulated by royal Casa de Contratación (House of Trade) based in Seville. Inter-regional trade was severely limited with merchants based in Spain and with overseas connections in the main colonial centers controlling the transatlantic trade.P. and H. Chaunu, Seville et l’Atlantique aux XVIe et XVIIe siècles. Paris: Flammarion 1977.Woodrow Borah, Early Colonial Trade and Navigation between Mexico and Peru. Berkeley: University of California Press, Ibero-Americana: 38, 1954 British traders began making inroads into the theoretically closed Spanish system in the eighteenth century, and the Spanish crown instituted a series of changes in policy in the eighteenth century, known as the Bourbon Reforms, designed to bring the Spanish America under closer crown control. However, one innovation was comercio libre ("free commerce"), which was not free trade as generally understood, but allowed all Spanish and Spanish American ports to be accessible to each other, excluding foreign traders, in a move to stimulate economic activity yet maintain crown control. At independence in the early nineteenth century, Spanish America and Brazil had no foreign investment or direct, legal contact with economic partners beyond those allowed within controlled trade.

Though the legislation passed by the Bourbons did much to reform the Empire, it was not enough to save it. The racial tensions continued to grow and massive discontent lead to a number of revolts, the most important of which were the Rebellion of Túpac Amaru II and Revolt of the Comuneros. Criollos, Mestizos, and Indians were among the most common to be involved in such revolts.[57] In the early nineteenth century, Spanish America and Brazil had no foreign investment or direct, legal contact with economic partners beyond those allowed within controlled trade. Over time, these facts led to the wars for the independence of the American colonies.

Economic impact of independence
Independence in Spanish America (except Cuba and Puerto Rico) and Brazil in the early nineteenth century had economic consequences as well as the obvious political one of sovereignty. New nation-states participated in the international economy. However, the gap between Latin America and Anglo-Saxon America widened. Scholars have attempted to account for the divergent paths of hemispheric development and prosperity between Latin America and British North America (the United States and Canada), seeking how Latin American economies fell behind English North America, which became an economic dynamo in the nineteenth century.Coatsworth, John H., "Obstacles to Economic Growth in Nineteenth-Century Mexico". American Historical Review 83: 1 (February 1978), pp. 80–100.Walter L. Bernecker and Hans Werner Tobler, eds. Development and Underdevelopment in America: Contrasts of Economic Growth in North and Latin America in Historical Perspective. Berlin 1993.

In the period before independence, Spanish America and Brazil were more important economically than the small English colonies on the Atlantic coast of North America. The English colonies of the mid-Atlantic, New England, and Canada had a temperate climate, no major indigenous populations whose labor could be exploited, and no major export commodities that would have encouraged the importation of black slaves. The southern English colonies with plantation agriculture and large black slave populations share more characteristics with Brazil and the Caribbean than the northern English colonies. That region is characterized by the family farm, with a homogeneous European-descent population with no sharp divide between rich and poor. Unlike Spanish America and Brazil which restricted immigration, the northern English colonies were a magnet for migration, encouraged by the British crown.

With independence, Iberian-born Spanish merchants who were key factors in the transatlantic trade and the availability of credit to silver miners exited from Spanish America, through self-exile, expulsion, or loss of life, draining the newly independent countries of entrepreneurs and professionals. Forced indigenous labor mita was abolished in the Andean region, with few continuing with such labor on a voluntary basis. African slavery was not abolished at independence, but in many parts of Spanish America, it had already waned as an important source of labor. In Brazil in the post-independence period, African slaves were used extensively with the development of coffee as a major export product. With the revolution in Haiti, which abolished slavery, many sugar plantation owners moved to Cuba, where sugar became the main cash crop.

Early Post-Independence (1830–1870)

In Spanish America, the disappearance of colonial-era economic restrictions (except for Cuba and Puerto Rico) did not produce immediate economic expansion "because investment, regional markets, credit and transport systems were disrupted" during the independence conflicts. Some regions faced greater continuity from colonial era economic patterns, mainly ones that were not involved in silver extraction and peripheral to the colonial economy. Newly independent Spanish American republics did see the need to replace Spanish colonial commercial law, but they did not put in place a new code until after the mid nineteenth century due to political instability and the lack of legal expertise. Until constitutions were put in place for the new sovereign nations, the task of crafting new laws was largely on hold. The legislatures were comprised on men who had no previous experience in governing, so that it was challenging to draft laws, including those to shape economic activity. Not having a stable political structure or legal framework that guaranteed property rights made potential entrepreneurs, including foreigners, less likely to invest. The dominance of large landed estates continued throughout the early nineteenth century and beyond.

Obstacles to economic growth
Many regions faced significant economic obstacles to economic growth. Many areas of Latin America was less integrated and less productive than they were in the colonial period, due to the political instability. The cost of the independence wars and the lack of a stable tax collection system left the new nation-states in tight financial situations. Even in places where the destruction of economic resources was less common, disruptions in financial arrangements and trading relationships caused a decline in some economic sectors.

A key feature that prevented economic expansion following political independence was the weak or absent central governments of the new nation-states that could maintain peace, collect taxes, develop infrastructure, expand commercial agriculture, restore the mining economies, and maintain the sovereignty of territory. The Spanish and Portuguese crowns forbade foreign immigration and foreign commercial involvement, but there were structural obstacles to economic growth. These included the power of the Roman Catholic Church and its hostility to religious toleration and liberalism as a political doctrine, and continued economic power in landholding and collection of the religious tax of the tithe; the lack of power of nation-states to impose taxation, and a legacy of state monopolies, and lack of technology. Elites were divided politically and had no experience with self-rule, a legacy of the Bourbon Reforms, which excluded American-born elite men from holding office. Independence from Spain and Portugal caused the breakdown of traditional commercial networks, which had been dominated by transatlantic trading houses based in Spain. The entrance of foreign merchants and imported goods led to competition with local producers and traders. Very few exports found world markets favorable enough to stimulate local growth, and very little capital was received from other countries, since foreign investors had little confidence in the security of their funds. Many new nation-states borrowed from foreign sources to fund the governments, causing the debt from the independence wars to increase.

Role of foreign powers
Latin America's political independence proved irreversible, but weak governments in Spanish American nation-states could not replicate the generally peaceful conditions of the colonial era. Although the United States was not a world power, it claimed authority over the hemisphere in the Monroe Doctrine (1823). Britain, the first country to industrialize and the world power dominating the nineteenth century, chose not to assert imperial power to rule Latin America directly, but it did have an influence on Latin American economies through neo-colonialism. Private British investment in Latin America began as early as the independence era, but increased in importance during the nineteenth century. To a lesser extent, the British government was involved. The British government did seek most favored nation status in trade, but, according to British historian D.C.M. Platt, did not promote particular British commercial enterprises.Rory Miller, Britain and Latin America in the nineteenth and twentieth centuries. London: Longman 1993, p. 47. Britain sought to end the African slave trade to Brazil and to the Spanish colonies of Cuba and Puerto Rico and to open Latin America to British merchants. Latin America became an outlet for Britain's manufactures, but the results were disappointing when merchants expected payment in silver. However, when Latin American exports filled British ships for the return voyage and economic growth was stimulated, the boom in Latin American exports occurred just after the middle of the Nineteenth century.

Export Booms (1870–1914)

The late 1800s represented a fundamental shift in the new developing Latin American nations. This transition was characterized by a re-orientation towards world markets, which was well underway before 1880. When Europe and the United States experienced an increase of industrialization, they realized the value of the raw materials in Latin America, which caused Latin American countries to move towards export economies. This economic growth also catalyzed social and political developments that constituted a new order. Historian Colin M. Lewis argues that "In relative terms, no other region of the world registered a similar increase in its share of world trade, finance, and population: Latin America gained relative presence in the world economy at the expense of other regions."

Favorable Government Policies

As the political situation stabilized toward the late nineteenth century, many governments actively promoted policies to attract capital and labor. The phrase "order and progress" were key concepts for this new stage for Latin American development, and actually put on the flag of the republic of Brazil in 1889, following the ouster of the monarchy. Mexico created legal guarantees for foreign investors during the regime of Porfirio Díaz (1876–1911), which overturned the legacy of colonial law. Colonial law vested the state with subsoil rights and gave full ownership rights to private investors. In Argentina, the constitution of 1853 gave foreigners basic civil rights. Many governments actively promoted foreign immigration, both to create a low-wage labor force, but also to change the racial and ethnic profile of populations. Laws ensuring religious toleration opened the door to Protestants. With unequal treaties with colonial powers behind them, major Latin Americans countries were able to implement autonomous trade policies during this period. They imposed some of the highest import tariffs in the world, with average tariffs between 17% and 47% Average per capita income during this period rose at the rapid annual rate of 1.8%.

Transportation and Communication
There were revolutions in communications and transportation that had major impacts on the economy. Much of the infrastructure was built through foreign financing, with financiers shifting from extending loans to governments to investments in infrastructure, such as railways and utilities, as well as mining and oil drilling. The construction of railroads transformed many regions economically. Given the lack of navigable river systems, which had facilitated economic development of the United States, the innovation of railroad construction overcame significant topographical obstacles and high transaction costs. Where large networks were constructed, they facilitated domestic economic integration as well as linking production zones to ports and borders for regional or international trade. "Increasing exports of primary commodities, rising imports of capital goods, the expansion of activities drawing directly and indirectly on overseas investment, the rising share of modern manufacturing in output, and a generalized increase in the pace and scope of economic activity were all tied closely to the timing and character of the region's infrastructural development." In some cases, railway lines did not produce such wide-ranging economic changes, with directly linked zones of production or extraction to ports without linkages to larger internal networks. An example is line built from the nitrate zone in northern Chile, seized during the War of the Pacific, to the coast. British capital facilitated railway construction in Argentina, Brazil, Peru, and Mexico, with significant economic impact.William Summerhill, Order against Progress: Government, Foreign Investment, and Railroads in Brazil, 1854–1913. Stanford: Stanford University Press 2003.

There was investment in improved port facilities to accommodate steamships, relieving a bottleneck in the transportation links, and resulting in ocean shipping costs dropping significantly. Brazil and Argentina showed the greatest growth in merchant steam shipping, with both foreign and domestic ships participating in the commerce. Although improved port facilities affected Latin American economies, it is not a well-studied topic. An exception is the opening of new port facilities in Buenos Aires in 1897. Innovations in communication, including the telegraph and submarine cables facilitated the transmission of information, vital to running far-flung business enterprises. Telegraph lines were often built beside railway lines.

Export commodities
Guano
An early boom and bust export in Peru was guano, bird excrement that contains high amounts of nitrates used for fertilizer. Deposits on islands owned by Peru were mined industrially and exported to Europe. The extraction was facilitated by Peruvian government policy.

Sugar
Sugar remained an important export commodity, but it fell in importance in Brazil, which shifted to coffee cultivation. Sugar expanded in the last Spanish colonies of Cuba and Puerto Rico with African slave labor, which was still legal in the Spanish empire.L.A. Figueroa, Sugar, Slavery, and Freedom in Nineteenth-Century Puerto Rico. Chapel Hill: University of North Carolina Press 2005. Sugar had previously been considered a luxury for consumers with little cash, but with its drop in price a mass market developed.Sidney Mintz, Sweetness and Power: The Place of Sugar in Modern History. New York: Penguin 1986. Previously Cuba had had a mix of agricultural products, but it became essentially a mono-crop export, with tobacco continuing to be cultivated for domestic consumption and for export.

Wheat
Wheat production for export was stimulated in Chile during the California gold rush of the mid-nineteenth century, but ended when transportation infrastructure in the U.S. was built. In Argentina, wheat became a major export product to Britain, since transport costs had dropped enough to make such a bulk product profitable. Wheat grown on the rich virgin soil of the pampas was mechanized on large enterprises during the boom.

Coffee

As foreign demand for coffee expanded in the nineteenth century, many areas of Latin America turned to its cultivation, where the climate was conducive. Brazil, Venezuela, Colombia, Guatemala, El Salvador, and Costa Rica became major coffee producers, which disrupted traditional land tenure patterns and necessitated a secure workforce. Brazil became dependent on the single crop of coffee. The expansion of coffee cultivation was a major factor in the persistence of slavery in Brazil, where it had been on the wane as Brazil's share of sugar production fell. Slave labor was redirected to coffee cultivation.

Rubber

A case study of a commodity boom and bust is the Amazon rubber boom. With the increasing pace of industrialization and the invention of the automobile, rubber became an important component. Found wild in Brazil and Peru, rubber trees were tapped by workers who collected the raw sap for later processing. The abuses against indigenous were chronicled by the British consul, Sir Roger Casement.

Petroleum

With the discovery of petroleum on the Gulf Coast of Mexico, British and U.S. enterprises invested heavily in drilling crude oil. Laws passed during the regime of Porfirio Díaz reversed colonial law that gave the state rights to subsoil resources, but liberal policies gave full ownership to oil companies to exploit the oil. Foreign ownership of oil was an issue in Mexico, with expropriation of foreign companies in 1938. Large petroleum deposits were found in Venezuela just after the turn of the twentieth century and has become the country's major export commodity.

Mining

Silver declined as a major export, but lesser minerals such as copper and tin became important starting in the late nineteenth century, with foreign investors providing capital. Tin became the main export product of Bolivia, eventually replacing silver, but silver extraction prompted the building of a railway line, which then allowed tin mining to be profitable. In Chile, copper mining became its most important export. It was a significant industry in Mexico as well. Extraction of nitrates from regions Chile acquired from Bolivia and Peru in its victory in the War of the Pacific became an important source of revenue.

Environmental degradation

Increasingly scholars have focused on the environmental costs of export economies, including deforestation, impacts of monoculture of sugar, bananas, and other agricultural exports, mining and other extractive industries on air, soil, and human populations.

Immigration and Labor
Following independence, most Latin American countries tried to attract immigrants, but only after political stability, increased foreign investment, and decreasing transportation costs on steamships, along with their speed and comfort in transit did migrants go in large numbers. Immigration from Europe as well as Asia provided a low-wage workforce for agriculture and industry.Thomas Holloway, Immigrants on the Land: Coffee and Society in São Paulo, 1886–1934. Chapel Hill: University of North Carolina Press 1980. Foreign immigrants were drawn to particular countries in Latin America: Argentina, Brazil (following the abolition of slavery), Uruguay, and Cuba, but the U.S. was the top destination in this period. Seasonal migration between Italy and Argentina developed, with laborers (so-called golondrinas "swallows") able to take advantage of the seasonal differences in the harvests and the higher wages paid in Argentina. Many went as single men rather than as part of families, who settled permanently.

In Peru, Chinese laborers were brought to work as virtual slaves on coastal sugar plantations, allowing the industry to survive, but when immigration was ended in the 1870s, forced labor was ended in the 1870s, landowners sought domestic laborers who migrated from other areas of Peru and kept in coercive conditions.M.J. Gonzales, Plantation Agriculture and Social Control in Northern Peru, 1875–1932. Chapel Hill: University of North Carolina Press 2005. In Brazil, recruitment of Japanese laborers was important for the coffee industry following the abolition of black slavery. Brazil also subsidized immigration from Europe, providing a low-wage workforce for coffee cultivation.

The labor force also expanded to include women working outside of the domestic sphere, including in coffee cultivation in Guatemala and in the industrial sector, examined in a case study in Antioquia, Colombia.

New Order emerging (1914–1945)

The outbreak of World War I in 1914 disrupted British and other European investment in Latin America, and the international economic order vanished. In the post–World War I period, Germany was eclipsed from trade ties with Latin America and Great Britain experienced significantly losses, leaving the United States in the dominant position.

Impact of World War I
During the World War I period (1914–18), few Latin Americans identified with either side of the conflict, although Germany attempted to draw Mexico into an alliance with the promise of the return of territories lost to the U.S. in the U.S.–Mexico War. The only country to enter the conflict was Brazil, which followed the example of the United States and declared war on Germany. Despite the general neutrality, all areas suffered disruption of trade and capital flows, since transatlantic transport was disrupted and European countries were focused on the war rather than investing overseas. The Latin American countries that were most affected were those that developed significant trade relations with Europe. Argentina, for example, experienced a sharp decline in trade as the Allied Powers diverted their products elsewhere, and Germany became inaccessible.

With the suspension of the gold standard for currencies, movement of capital was interrupted and European banks called in loans to Latin America, provoking domestic crises. Direct foreign investment from Great Britain, the dominant European power, ended. The United States, which was neutral in World War I until 1917, sharply increased its purchases of Latin American commodities. Commodities useful for the war, such as metals, petroleum, and nitrates, increased in value, and source countries (Mexico, Peru, Bolivia, and Chile) were favoured.

Transportation
The United States was in an advantageous position to expand trade with Latin America, with already strong ties with Mexico, Central America, and the Caribbean. With the opening of the Panama Canal in 1914 and the disruption of the transatlantic trade, U.S. exports to Latin America increased. As transportation in the Caribbean became cheaper and more available, fragile tropical imports, especially bananas could be reach mass markets in the United States. U.S. Navy ships deemed surplus following the Spanish–American War (1898) were made available to the United Fruit Company, which created its "Great White Fleet." Latin American countries dominated by U.S. interests were dubbed banana republics.

Banking systems
An important development in this period was the creation and expansion of the banking system, especially the establishment central banks in most Latin American countries, to regulate the money supply and implement monetary policy. In addition, a number of countries created more specialized state banks for development (industrial, agricultural, and foreign trade) in the 1930s and 1940s. The U.S. entered the private banking sector in Latin America in the Caribbean and in South America, opening branch banks. A number of Latin American countries invited prominent Princeton University professor Edwin W. Kemmerer ("the money doctor") to advise them on financial matters. He advocated financial plans based on strong currencies, the gold standard, central banks, and balanced budgets. The 1920s saw the establishment of central banks in the 1920s in the Andean region (Chile, Peru, Bolivia, Ecuador, and Colombia) as a direct result of the Kemmerer missions.

In Mexico, the Banco de México was created in 1925, during the post-Mexican Revolution presidency of Plutarco Elías Calles using Mexican experts, such as Manuel Gómez Morín, rather than advisers from the U.S. As industrialization, agricultural reform, and regulated foreign commercial ties became important in Mexico, the state established a number of specialized state banks. Argentina, which has longstanding ties to Great Britain, set up its central bank, the Banco Central de la República de Argentina (1935) under the advice of Sir Otto Niemeyer of the Bank of England, with Raúl Prebisch as its first president. Private banking also began to expand.

Changes in U.S. law that had previously prevented the opening of branch banks in foreign countries meant that branch banks were opened in places where U.S. trade ties were strong. A number of Latin American countries became not only linked to the U.S. financially, but the U.S. government pursued foreign-policy objectives. Post-war commodity prices were unstable, there was an oversupply of commodities, and some governments attempted to manipulate commodity prices, such as Brazil's attempt to raise coffee prices, which in turn caused Colombia to increase its production. Since most Latin American countries had been dependent of the commodity export sector for their economic well-being, the fall in commodity prices and the lack of increase in the non-export sector left them in a weak position.

Manufacturing for a domestic market

Manufacturing for either a domestic or export market had not been a major feature of Latin American economies, but some steps had been taken in the late nineteenth and early twentieth centuries, including in Argentina, often seen as the key example of an export-dependent economy, one based on beef, wool, and wheat exports to Britain. Argentina experienced growth of domestic industry in the period 1870–1930, which responded to domestic demand for goods generally not imported (beer, biscuits, cigarettes, glass, paper, shoes). Beer manufacturing was established in the late nineteenth century, mainly by German immigrants to Argentina, Chile, and Mexico. Improvements in beer production that kept the product stable for longer and the development of transportation networks meant that beer reached a mass market.

Impact of the Great Depression
The external shock of the Great Depression had uneven impacts on Latin American economies. The values of exports generally decreased, but in some cases, such as Brazilian coffee, the volume of exports increased. Credit from Britain evaporated. Although the so-called money doctors from the U.S. and the U.K. made recommendations to Latin American governments on financial policies, they were generally not adopted. Latin American governments abandoned the gold standard, devalued their currencies, introduced foreign currency controls, and attempted to adjust payments for foreign debt servicing, or defaulted, including Mexico and Colombia. There was a sharp decline in imports, resulting also in the decline of revenues from import duties. In Brazil, the central government destroyed three years' worth of coffee production to keep coffee prices high.

Latin America recovered relatively quickly from the worst of the Depression, but exports did not reach the levels of the late 1920s. Britain attempted to reimpose policies of preferential treatment from Argentina in the Roca-Runciman Treaty. The U.S. pressed better trade relations with Latin American countries with implementation of the Reciprocal Tariff Act of 1934, following on the Good Neighbor Policy of 1933. Nazi Germany's policies dramatically expanded its bilateral trade with various Latin American countries. There was a huge increase in Brazilian cotton exports to Germany. The 1937 recession in the U.S. affected GDP growth in Latin American countries.

World War II
With the outbreak of World War II in 1939, Latin American trade with Germany ceased due to the insecurity of the sea lanes from German submarine activity and the British economic blockade. For Latin American countries not trading significantly with the U.S. the impacts were greater. For Latin America, the war had economic benefits as they became suppliers of products useful to the Allied war effort and they accumulated balances in hard currency as imports dwindled and the prices for war-related commodities increased. These improved Latin American governments' ability to implement programs of import substitution industrialization, which expanded substantially in the post-war period.

Changing role of the state, 1945–73
Social changes
Increasing birth rates, falling death rates, migration of rural dwellers to urban centers, and the growth of the industrial sector began to change the profile of many Latin American countries. Population pressure in rural areas and the general lack of land reform (Mexico and Bolivia excepted) produced tension in rural areas, sometimes leading to violence in Colombia and Peru in the 1950s. Countries expanded public education, which were increasingly aimed at incorporating marginalized groups, but the system also increased social segmentation with different tiers of quality. Schools shifted their focus over time from creating citizens of a democracy to training workers for the expanding industrial sector. Actually, educational inequality, which peaked during the 19th century, began decreasing in the 20th century. Yet, the reverberations of Latin America having the highest educational inequality worldwide during the first period are still perceptible today. Economic inequality and social tensions would come into sharper focus following the January 1959 Cuban Revolution.

Economic nationalism

Many Latin American governments began to actively take a role in economic development in the post-World War II era, creating state-owned companies for infrastructure projects or other enterprises, which created a new type of Latin American entrepreneur.

Mexico nationalized its petroleum industry in 1938 from the British and U.S. companies that had developed it. The Mexican government did that with full legal authority, since the revolutionary-era Mexican Constitution gave the state authority to take control over natural resources, reversing the liberal legislation of the late nineteenth century granting inalienable property rights to private citizens and companies. The government of Lázaro Cárdenas expropriated foreign oil interests and created the state-owned company, Petroleos Mexicanos (PEMEX). Mexico provided a model for other Latin American countries to nationalize their own industries in the post-war period. Brazil established the state monopoly oil company Petrobras in 1953.Peter Seaborn Smith, Oil and Politics in Modern Brazil. Toronto: Macmillan of Canada 1976. Other governments also followed policies of economic nationalism and an expanded economic role for the state. In Argentina, the five-year plan promulgated by the government of Juan Perón sought to nationalize state services. In Bolivia, the 1952 revolution under Victor Paz Estenssoro overturned the small group of businessmen controlling tin, the country's main export, and nationalized the industry, and decreed a sweeping land reform and universal suffrage to adult Bolivians.

Many Latin American countries benefited from their participation in World War II and accumulated financial reserves that could be mobilized for the expansion of industry through import substitution industrialization.

New Institutional frameworks for economic development
In the post-World War II era, a new framework to structure the international system emerged with the U.S. rather than Britain as the key power. In 1944, a multi-nation group, led by the United States and Britain, forged formal institutions to structure the post-war international economy: The Bretton Woods agreements created the International Monetary Fund, to stabilize the financial system and exchange rates, and the World Bank, to supply capital for infrastructure projects. The U.S. was focused on the rebuilding of Western European economies, and Latin America did not initially benefit from these new institutions. However, the General Agreement on Tariffs and Trade (GATT), signed in 1947, did have Argentina, Chile and Cuba as signatories. GATT had a legal structure to promote international trade by reducing tariffs. The Uruguay Round of GATT talks (1986–1994) resulted in the formation of the World Trade Organization.

With the creation of the United Nations after World War II, that institution created the Economic Commission for Latin America, also known by its Spanish acronym CEPAL, to develop and promote economic strategies for the region. It includes members from Latin America as well as industrialized countries elsewhere. Under its second director, Argentine economist Raúl Prebisch (1950–1963), author of The Economic Development of Latin America and its Principal Problems (1950), CEPAL recommended import substitution industrialization, as a key strategy to overcome underdevelopment.Gert Rosenthal, "ECLAC: Forty Years of Continuity with Change" in CEPAL Review no. 35 (Aug. 1988) 7–12. Many Latin American countries did pursue strategies of inward development and attempted regional integration, following the analyses of CEPAL, but by the end of the 1960s, economic dynamism had not been restored and "Latin American policy-making elites began to pay more attention to alternative ideas on trade and development."

The lack of focus on Latin American development in the post-war period was addressed by the creation of the Inter-American Development Bank (IDB) was established in April 1959, by the U.S. and initially nineteen Latin American countries, to provide credit to Latin American governments for social and economic development projects. Earlier ideas for creating such a bank date to the 1890s, but did not come to fruition. However, in the post-World War II era, there was a renewed push, particularly since the newly established World Bank was more focused on rebuilding Europe. A report by Argentine economist Raúl Prebisch urged the creation of a fund to enable development of agriculture and industry. In Brazil, President Juscelino Kubitschek endorsed the plan to create such a bank, and the Eisenhower administration in the U.S. showed a strong interest in the plan and a negotiating commission was created to develop the framework for the bank. Since its founding the IDB has been headquartered in Washington, D.C., but unlike the World Bank whose directors have always been U.S. nationals, the IDB has had directors originally from Latin America. Most funded projects are economic and social infrastructure, including "agriculture, energy, industry, transportation, public health, the environment, education, science and technology, and urban development." The Inter-American Development Bank was established in 1959, coincidentally the year of the Cuban Revolution; however, the role of the bank expanded as many countries saw the need for development aid to Latin America. The number of partner nations has increased over the years, with an expansion of non-borrowing nations to Western Europe, Canada, and China, providing credit to the bank.

Latin America developed a tourism industry aimed at attracting foreign and domestic travelers. In Mexico, the government developed infrastructure in Acapulco in the 1950s and Cancun, beginning in 1970, to create beach resorts. Indigenous areas that had been economic backwaters in the industrial economy became destinations for tourism, often resulting in commodification of culture.

Impact of the Cuban Revolution
A major shock to the new order of U.S. hegemony in the hemisphere was the 1959 Cuban Revolution. It shifted quickly from reform within existing norms to the declaration that Cuba was a socialist nation. With Cuba's alliance with the Soviet Union, Cuba found an outlet for its sugar following the U.S. embargo on its longstanding purchases of Cuba's monoculture crop. Cuba expropriated holdings by foreigners, including large numbers of sugar plantations owned by U.S. and Canadian investors. For the United States, the threat that revolution could spread elsewhere in Latin America prompted U.S. President John F. Kennedy to proclaim the Alliance for Progress in 1961, designed to aid other Latin American governments with implementing programs to alleviate poverty and promote development.

1960s–1970s
A critique of the developmentalist strategy emerged in the 1960s as dependency theory, articulated by scholars who saw Latin American countries' economic underdevelopment as resulting from the penetration of capitalism that trapped countries in a dependent position supplying commodities to the developed countries. Andre Gunder Frank's Latin America: Underdevelopment or Revolution (1969) made a significant impact as did Fernando Henrique Cardoso and Enzo Faletto's Dependency and Development in Latin America (1979). It has been superseded by other approaches including post-imperialism.Peter Evans, "After Dependency: Recent Studies of Class, State, and Industrialization," Latin American Research Review 20 no. 2 (1985), 149–60.

A "peaceful road to socialism" appeared for a time to be possible. In 1970, Chile elected as president socialist Salvador Allende, in a plurality. This was seen as a "peaceful road to socialism," rather than armed revolution of the Cuban model. Allende attempted to implement a number of significant reforms, some of which had already been approved but not implemented by the previous administration of Christian Democrat Eduardo Frei. Frei had defeated Allende in the previous presidential election (1964) in good part because he promised significant reform without serious structural change to Chile, while maintaining rule of law. He promised agrarian reform, tax reform, and the nationalization of the copper industry. There was rising polarization and violence in Chile and increasing hostility by the administration of U.S. President Richard Nixon. A U.S.-supported military coup against Allende on September 11, 1973, during which he committed suicide ended the transition to socialism and ushered in an era of political repression and economic course changes.Mark Falcoff, "Eduardo Frei Montalva" in Encyclopedia of Latin American History and Culture, vol. 2, p. 613. The successful 1973 coup in Chile signaled that substantial political and change would not come without violence. Leftist revolutions in Nicaragua (1979) and the protracted warfare in El Salvador saw the U.S. back low-intensity warfare in the 1980s, one component of which was damaging their economies.

In an effort to diversify their economies by avoiding over reliance on the export of raw materials, Latin American nations argued that their developing industries needed higher tariffs to protect against the importation of manufactured goods from more established competitors in more industrialized areas of the world. These views largely prevailed in the United Nations Conference on Trade and Development (UNCTAD) and were even accepted in 1964 as the new part IV of the GATT (General Agreement of Tariffs and Trade). Per capita income in Latin America in the 1960s and 1970s grew at the rapid annual rate of 3.1%.

Reorientations 1970s–2000s

By the 1970s, the world economy had undergone significant changes and Latin American countries were seeing the limits of inward turning development, which had been based on pessimism about the potential of export-led growth. In the developed world, rising wages made seeking lower-wage locations to build factories more attractive. Multinational corporations (MNCs) had movable capital to invest in developing countries, particularly in Asia. Latin American countries took note as these newly industrializing countries experienced significant growth in GDP. As Latin American countries became more open to foreign investment and export-led growth in manufacturing, the stable post-war financial system of the Bretton Woods agreements, which had depended on fixed exchange rates tied to the value of the U.S. dollar was ending. In 1971, the U.S. ended the U.S. dollar's convertibility to gold, which made it difficult for Latin American countries, as well as other developing countries to make economic decisions. At the same time, there was a boom in commodity prices, particularly oil as the Organization of the Petroleum Exporting Countries OPEC limited production while demand continued to soar, resulting in worldwide price rises in the price per barrel. With the rise in oil prices, oil producing countries had considerable capital to invest and international banks based in the U.S. expanded their reach, investing in Latin America.

Latin American countries took on debt to fuel the economic growth and integration into a globalizing market. The promise of export earnings using borrowed money enticed many Latin American countries to take on loans, valued in U.S. dollars, that could expand their economic capacity. Creditors were eager to invest in Latin America, since in the mid-1970s real interest rates were low and optimistic commodity forecasts made lending a rational economic decision. Foreign capital poured into Latin America, linking developed and developing countries financially. The vulnerabilities in the arrangement were initially ignored.

Mexico in the early 1970s saw economic stagnation. With the discovery of huge oil reserves in the Gulf of Mexico in the mid-1970s, Mexico appeared to be able to take advantage of high oil prices to spend on industrialization as well as fund social programs. Foreign banks were eager to lend to Mexico, since it seemed to be stable, had effectively a one-party political system that had kept social unrest to a minimum. Also reassuring to international lenders was that Mexico had maintained a fixed exchange rate with the U.S. dollar since 1954. President José López Portillo (1976–82) broke with long-standing treasury practice of not taking on foreign debt, and borrowed extensively in U.S. dollars against future oil revenues. With the subsequent crash of the price of oil in 1981–82, Mexico's economy was in shambles and unable to make payments on the loans. The government devalued its currency, placed a 90-day moratorium on payment of the principal on external public debt, and finally López Portillo nationalized banking in the country and exchange controls on currency were imposed without warning. International lending institutions were themselves vulnerable when Mexico defaulted on its debt, since Mexican debt accounted for 44% of the capital of the nine largest U.S. banks.Thorp, Progress, Poverty, and Exclusion, p. 215.

Some Latin American countries did not take part in this trend toward heavy borrowing from international banks. Cuba remained dependent on the Soviet Union to prop up its economy, until the collapse of that state in the 1990s cut Cuba off, sending it into a severe economic crisis known as the Special Period. Colombia limited its borrowing and instead instituted tax reform, which raised government revenues significantly. But the general economic downturn of the 1980s plunged Latin American economies into crisis.

Latin American countries' borrowing from U.S. and other international banks exposed them to extreme risk when interest rates rose in the lending countries and commodity prices fell in the borrowing countries. Capital flows to Latin America reversed, with capital flight from Latin America immediately preceding the 1982 shock. The rise in interest rates affected borrowing countries, since servicing the debt directly affected national budgets. In many cases, the national currency was devalued, which cut demand for imports that now cost more. Inflation hit new levels, with the poor acutely affected. Governments cut social spending, and overall, poverty grew, and income distribution worsened.

Washington Consensus
The economic crisis in Latin America was addressed by what came to be known as the Washington Consensus, which was articulated by John Williamson in 1989. These principles were:
 Fiscal policy discipline, with avoidance of large fiscal deficits relative to GDP;
 Redirection of public spending from subsidies ("especially indiscriminate subsidies") toward broad-based provision of key pro-growth, pro-poor services like primary education, primary health care and infrastructure investment;
 Tax reform, broadening the tax base and adopting moderate marginal tax rates;
 Interest rates that are market determined and positive (but moderate) in real terms;
 Competitive exchange rates;
 Trade liberalization: liberalization of imports, with particular emphasis on elimination of quantitative restrictions (licensing, etc.); any trade protection to be provided by low and relatively uniform tariffs;
 Liberalization of inward foreign direct investment;
 Privatization of state enterprises;
 Deregulation: abolition of regulations that impede market entry or restrict competition, except for those justified on safety, environmental and consumer protection grounds, and prudential oversight of financial institutions;
 Legal security for property rights.

These principles focused on liberalization of trade policy, reduction of the role of the state, and fiscal orthodoxy. The term "Washington Consensus" implies that "the consensus comes or is imposed from Washington."

Latin American governments undertook a series of structural reforms in the 1980s and 90s, including trade liberalization for must of Latin America and privatization, which were often made a condition of loans by the IMF and the World Bank. Chile, which had experienced the 1973 military coup and then years of dictatorial rule, implemented sweeping economic changes in the 1970s: stabilization (1975); privatization (1974–78); financial reform (1975); labor reform (1979); pension reform (1981). Mexico's economy had crashed in 1982, and it began shifting its long-term economic policies to reform finances in 1986, but even more significant change came under the government of Carlos Salinas de Gortari (1988–1994). Salinas sought Mexico's entry into the Canada-U.S. free trade agreement, so that liberalization of trade policies, privatization of state-owned companies, and legal security for property rights were essential if Mexico was to be successful. Changes in the 1917 Mexican Constitution were passed in 1992 that shifted the role of the Mexican state. Canada and the U.S., as well as Mexico entered into the North American Free Trade Agreement (NAFTA), which came into effect in January 1994. Per capita income in Latin America during the 1990s grew at an annual rate of 1.7% approximately half the rate of the 1960s–1970s.

Growth of rural population in this period resulted in migrations to cities, where job opportunities were better, and movement to other rural areas opened up by road construction. Landless peasant populations in the Amazon basin, Central America, southern Mexico, and the Chocó region of Colombia have occupied ecologically fragile areas. The expansion of cultivation into new areas for agro-exports have resulted in environmental degradation, including soil erosion and loss of biodiversity.

Economic cooperation and free trade agreements

With the formation in 1947 of the General Agreement of Tariffs and Trade (GATT), a framework was established to lower tariffs and increase trade between member countries. It eliminated differential treatment between individual nations, such as most favored nation status, and treated all member states equally. In 1995, GATT became the World Trade Organization (WTO) to meet the growing institutional needs of a deepening globalization. Although trade barriers fell with GATT and the WTO, the requirement that all member states be treated equally and the need for all to agree on terms meant that there were several rounds of negotiations. The Doha round most recent talks, have stalled. Many countries have established bi-lateral trade agreements and there has been a proliferation of them, dubbed the Spaghetti bowl effect.

Free trade agreements in Latin America and countries outside the region were established in the twentieth century. Some were short-lived, such as Caribbean Free Trade Association (1958–1962), which was later expanded into the Caribbean Community. Dominican Republic–Central America Free Trade Agreement initially included only Central American nations (excluding Mexico) and the U.S., but was expanded to include the Dominican Republic. The North American Free Trade Agreement (NAFTA) was an expansion of the bilateral agreement between the U.S. and Canada, to include Mexico, coming into force in January 1994. Other agreements include Mercosur was established in 1991 by the Treaty of Asunción as a customs union, with member states of Argentina; Brazil; Paraguay; Uruguay and Venezuela (suspended since December 2016). The Andean Community (Comunidad Andina, CAN) is a customs union comprising the South American countries of Bolivia, Colombia, Ecuador, and Peru, originally established in 1969 as the Andean Pact, and then in 1996 as the Comunidad Andina. Mercosur and CAN are the two largest trade blocs in South America.

Following the 2016 election of Donald Trump in the United States, there have been negotiations on NAFTA, which will likely take into account changes in the economic situation since it came into effect in 1994. These include the "transnationalization of services and the rise of the so-called digital/data economy – including communications, informatics, digital and platform technology, e-commerce, financial services, professional and technical work, and a host of other intangible products."

Migration and remittances
The migration of Latin Americans to areas with more prosperous economies has resulted meant the loss population across international borders, particularly the U.S. But the remittances of money to their non-migrating families represent an important infusion to the countries' economies. A report by the Global Knowledge Partnership on Migration and Development (KNOMAD) estimates for 2017 that remittances to Mexico would be $30.5 billion, Guatemala $8.7B; Dominican Republic $5.7B, Colombia $5.5B; and El Salvador $5.1B.

Corruption

Corruption is a major problem for Latin American countries and affects their economies. According to Transparency International in its 2015 report ranking 167 countries by the perception of transparency, Uruguay ranked (21) the highest with 72% perception of transparency, with other major Latin American countries ranked considerably lower, Colombia rank 83/36%; Argentina 106/35%; Mexico 111/34%; and Venezuela the lowest at 158/19%. The illegal drug trade, particularly of cocaine from the Andes that is transshipped throughout the hemisphere, generates huge profits. Money laundering of these black market funds is one result, often with the complicity of financial institutions and government officials. Violence from narcotrafficking has been significant in Colombia and Mexico.

Economic sectors
Main trading partners

Sectors by industry
Agriculture

Agriculture is a sector of most Latin American economies, but in general those countries depending on agriculture as a major component of GDP are less developed than those with a robust industrial sector. There is an unequal distribution of landholders, dating to the colonial era. In many countries a disproportionate number of small cultivators who are not entirely self-sufficient, subsistence farmers, but are not part of the export economy. Agricultural productivity itself could be another reason for inequality in a given region. That is to say, agricultural incomes could lag behind industrial and service sector incomes leading to higher inequality. Latin America produces and exports a diverse range of agricultural products such as coffee, cacao, bananas, soya, and beef, but most countries only produce one or two such exports.Solbrig, "Structure, Performance, and Policy in Agriculture," p. 484. Latin America accounts for 16% of the world's food and agriculture production. Brazil and Argentina lead the region in terms of net export due to high grain, oilseed, and animal protein exports. The structure of the agriculture sector is very diverse. In Brazil and Argentina large farms account for most of the commercial agriculture, but in much of Latin America, agriculture production comes from the region's small farms.

Global demand for agricultural products is rising due to the world's growing population and income levels. By 2050, the world's population is expected to reach 9 billion people and the demand for food is forecast to be 60% higher than it was in 2014. Distribution of unexploited land in Latin America is very uneven, with Brazil and Argentina having the most access to additional land.

Rabobank reports that Latin American has achieved rates of agricultural productivity that are above the global average, however, there is a lot of variation in the performance of the individual countries. For large commercial farms, investment in precision agriculture and plant breeding techniques will lead to an increase in productivity, and for small-scale farms, access to basic technology and information services will lead to an increase in productivity.

The four countries with the strongest agriculture in South America are Brazil, Argentina, Chile and Colombia. Currently:

 Brazil is the world's largest producer of sugarcane, soy, coffee, orange, guaraná, açaí and Brazil nut; is one of the top 5 producers of maize, papaya, tobacco, pineapple, banana, cotton, beans, coconut, watermelon, lemon and yerba mate; is one of the top 10 world producers of cocoa, cashew, avocado, tangerine, persimmon, mango, guava, rice, oat, sorghum and tomato; and is one of the top 15 world producers of grape, apple, melon, peanut, fig, peach, onion, palm oil and natural rubber;
 Argentina is the world's largest producer of yerba mate; is one of the 5 largest producers in the world of soy, maize, sunflower seed, lemon and pear, one of the 10 largest producers in the world of barley, grape, artichoke, tobacco and cotton, and one of the 15 largest producers in the world of wheat, oat, chickpea, sugarcane, sorghum and grapefruit;
 Chile is one of the 5 largest world producers of cherry and cranberry, and one of the 10 largest world producers of grape, apple, kiwi, peach, plum and hazelnut, focusing on exporting high-value fruits;
 Colombia is one of the 5 largest producers in the world of coffee, avocado and palm oil, and one of the 10 largest producers in the world of sugarcane, banana, pineapple and cocoa;
 Peru is the world's largest producer of quinoa; is one of the 5 largest producers of avocado, blueberry, artichoke and asparagus; one of the 10 largest producers in the world of coffee and cocoa; one of the 15 largest producers in the world of potato and pineapple, and also has a considerable production of grape, sugarcane, rice, banana, maize and cassava; its agriculture is considerably diversified;
 Paraguay's agriculture is currently developing, being currently the 6th largest producer of soy in the world and entering the list of the 20 largest producers of maize and sugarcane.

In Central America, the following stand out:
 Guatemala, one of the 10 largest producers in the world of coffee, sugar cane, melon and natural rubber, and one of the world's 15 largest producers of banana and palm oil;
 Honduras, which is one of the 5 largest producers of coffee in the world, and one of the 10 largest producers of palm oil;
 Costa Rica, which is the world's largest producer of pineapple;
 Dominican Republic, which is one of the world's top 5 producers of papaya and avocado, and one of the 10 largest producers of cocoa.

Mexico is the world's largest producer of avocado, one of the world's top 5 producers of chili, lemon, orange, mango, papaya, strawberry, grapefruit, pumpkin and asparagus, and one of the world's 10 largest producers of sugar cane, maize, sorghum, bean, tomato, coconut, pineapple, melon and blueberry.

Brazil is the world's largest exporter of chicken meat: 3.77 million tons in 2019.maiores exportadores de carne de frango entre os anos de 2015 e 2019 The country is the holder of the second largest herd of cattle in the world, 22.2% of the world herd. The country was the second largest producer of beef in 2019, responsible for 15.4% of global production. It was also the 3rd largest world producer of milk in 2018. This year, the country produced 35.1 billion liters. In 2019, Brazil was the 4th largest pork producer in the world, with almost 4 million tons.

In 2018, Argentina was the 4th largest producer of beef in the world, with a production of 3 million tons (behind only USA, Brazil and China). Uruguay is also a major meat producer. In 2018, it produced 589 thousand tons of beef.

In the production of chicken meat, Mexico is among the 10 largest producers in the world, Argentina among the 15 largest and Peru and Colombia among the 20 largest. In the production of beef, Mexico is one of the 10 largest producers in the world and Colombia is one of the 20 largest producers. In the production of pork, Mexico is among the 15 largest producers in the world. In the production of honey, Argentina is among the 5 largest producers in the world, Mexico among the 10 largest and Brazil among the 15 largest. In terms of cow's milk production, Mexico is among the 15 largest producers in the world and Argentina among the 20.

Mining and petroleum

Mining for precious metals dates to the prehispanic period in Latin America and was the economic driver for the throughout the colonial period in Spanish America and in the eighteenth century in Brazil. Extraction of minerals and petroleum dominate certain countries' economies rather than agriculture, especially Venezuela, Mexico, Chile, and Bolivia. In general, mining sites had only a local environmental impact, using relatively low-energy technology such as hand tools, but modern mining technologies use machinery and create open pits mines rather than tunnels, with considerable environmental impact. These enterprises are large scale industrial enterprises requiring considerable capital investment. An exception to this model is gold mining in river systems, especially the Amazon, where poor miners extract gold from auriferous sands, and somewhat larger scale enterprises dredge the sands. Toxic chemicals are used in mine processing, including mercury and arsenic. Discharge of chemical waste into water systems contaminate them. Current mining practices create problems in all stages of production, from extraction to finished product.

Recent mining of lithium in the Northwest of Argentina and Bolivia, as well as the discovery of new deposits are important since lithium is a key component in batteries to power electronics, such as mobile phones, electric cars, and electricity grids. Argentina's resources are now being mined by a joint Australian-Japanese-Argentina venture. Chile has been a major producer for decades, from the Atacama salt flat.

Latin America produces 45% of the world's copper, 50% of the world's silver, 26% of the world's molybdenum, and 21% of the world's zinc.

Half of the participants in a BNAmerica's mining survey believe that political and legal uncertainty will slow mining investment in Latin America in 2017. However, individual countries have implemented changes that could improve conditions for mining companies in 2017. Costs related to labor, energy, and supplies have increased for Latin American mining companies. Thus, many companies are focused on reducing costs and improving efficiency to achieve growth. Some companies are looking towards consolidation, automation, and owner-operated mines to lessen the impacts of rising costs.

In the mining sector, Brazil stands out in the extraction of iron ore (where it is the second world exporter), copper, gold, bauxite (one of the 5 largest producers in the world), manganese (one of the 5 largest producers in the world), tin (one of the largest producers in the world), niobium (concentrates 98% of reserves known to the world) and nickel. In terms of precious stones, Brazil is the world's largest producer of amethyst, topaz, agate and one of the main producers of tourmaline, emerald, aquamarine and garnet. Chile contributes about a third of the world copper production. In 2018, Peru was the 2nd largest producer of silver and copper in the world, and the 6th largest producer of gold (the 3 metals that generate the highest value), in addition to being the 3rd largest producer in the world of zinc and tin and 4th in lead. Bolivia is the 5th largest producer of tin, the 7th largest producer of silver, and the 8th largest producer of zinc in the worldAnuário Mineral Brasileiro 2018Mexico is the largest producer of silver in the world, representing almost 23% of world production, producing more than 200 million ounces in 2019. It also has important copper and zinc and produces a significant amount of gold.

In the production of oil, Brazil was the 10th largest oil producer in the world in 2019, with 2.8 million barrels / day. Mexico was the twelfth largest, with 2.1 million barrels / day, Colombia in 20th place with 886 thousand barrels / day, Venezuela was the twenty-first place, with 877 thousand barrels / day, Ecuador in 28th with 531 thousand barrels / day and Argentina. 29 with 507 thousand barrels / day. Since Venezuela and Ecuador consume little oil and export most of their production, they are part of OPEC. Venezuela had a big drop in production after 2015 (where it produced 2.5 million barrels / day), falling in 2016 to 2.2 million, in 2017 to 2 million, in 2018 to 1.4 million and in 2019 to 877 thousand, due to lack of investments.

In the production of natural gas, in 2018, Argentina produced 1,524 bcf (billions of cubic feet), Mexico produced 999, Venezuela 946, Brazil 877, Bolivia 617, Peru 451, Colombia 379.

Manufacturing

Although a significant proportion of production is in the mining and agricultural sectors, various countries of Latin America have significant manufacturing sectors as well. The economies of Argentina, Brazil, Chile, and Mexico have been the most heavily industrialized countries, accounting for 75% of Latin America's manufacturing sector. In a number of cases, governments followed policies of import substitution industrialization, setting up tariffs against foreign manufactured goods in order to encourage domestic manufacturing industries. Latin America has developed a significant automotive manufacturing, with foreign companies setting up plants in Brazil, Mexico, and elsewhere. In Mexico, for example, the Ford Motor Company set up a plant in 1925, and the automotive industry in Mexico includes most of the major car makers.Mark Bennett. Public Policy and Industrial Development: The Case of the Mexican Auto-Parts Industry. Boulder: Westview Press 1986. Assembly plants known as maquiladoras or maquilas, where imported components are turned into finished products and then exported have boomed along the U.S.–Mexico border. Brazil's automotive industry played an important role in the country's industrial development. Because of the transportation challenges in Brazil, with coastal cities not easily connected by road or rail, the country took steps to develop an aircraft industry and in 1969, the company Embraer was founded, specializing in regional jets.

The World Bank annually lists the top manufacturing countries by total manufacturing value. According to the 2019 list, Mexico would have the twelfth most valuable industry in the world (US$217.8 billion), Brazil has the thirteenth largest (US$173.6 billion), Venezuela the thirtieth largest (US$58.2 billion, however, which depend on oil to obtain this value), Argentina the 31st largest (US$57.7 billion), Colombia the 46th largest (US$35.4 billion), Peru the 50th largest (US$28.7 billion) and Chile the 51st largest (US$28.3 billion).

In Latin America, few countries achieve projection in industrial activity: Brazil, Argentina, Mexico and, less prominently, Chile. Begun late, the industrialization of these countries received a great boost from World War II: this prevented the countries at war from buying the products they were used to importing and exporting what they produced. At that time, benefiting from the abundant local raw material, the low wages paid to the labor force and a certain specialization brought by immigrants, countries such as Brazil, Mexico and Argentina, as well as Venezuela, Chile, Colombia and Peru, were able to implement important industrial parks. In general, in these countries there are industries that require little capital and simple technology for their installation, such as the food processing and textile industries. The basic industries (steel, etc.) also stand out, as well as the metallurgical and mechanical industries.

The industrial parks of Brazil, Mexico, Argentina and Chile, however, present much greater diversity and sophistication, producing advanced technology items. In the rest of Latin American countries, mainly in Central America, the processing industries of primary products for export predominate.

In the food industry, in 2019, Brazil was the second largest exporter of processed foods in the world. In 2016, the country was the 2nd largest producer of pulp in the world and the 8th producer of paper. In the footwear industry, in 2019, Brazil ranked 4th among world producers. In 2019, the country was the 8th producer of vehicles and the 9th producer of steel in the world. In 2018, the chemical industry of Brazil was the 8th in the world. In textile industry, Brazil, although it was among the 5 largest world producers in 2013, is very little integrated in world trade. In the aviation sector, Brazil has Embraer, the third largest aircraft manufacturer in the world, behind Boeing and Airbus.

Gallery

Financial
Latin American countries have had functioning banks and stock exchanges since the nineteenth century. Central banks have been established in most countries of Latin America to issue currency, manage flows, and implement monetary policy. In countries where there was significant commodity export activity and foreign capital presence, stock exchanges were established in the nineteenth century: Rio de Janeiro, Brazil (1845); Buenos Aires, Argentina (1854); Peru (1860); Rosario, Argentina; Mexico (1886); Uruguay (1867). Most other Latin American countries that created stock exchanges did so in the late twentieth century.

In the late twentieth century, narcotrafficking, particularly cocaine in parts of Latin America infused some economies with large amounts of cash. Two Colombian narcotrafficking organizations, the Cali Cartel and the Medellin Cartel, utilized the First InterAmericas Bank to launder large amounts of money in Panama. Data leaks such as the Panama Papers indicate the importance of money laundering in that country, where the Mossack Fonseca ran a global network of money laundry in the main financial centers like London, NYC, Hong Kong, Singapore, man island, Jersey, Monaco, Zurich. 90% of the laundry was made in the developed countries. Panamá by year could clean 3 billion dollars, but centers like London at least 63 billions per year.

Infrastructure

In Latin America, the level of infrastructure is described as inadequate and is one of the region's main barriers to economic growth and development. The International Monetary Fund reports that there is a positive correlation between infrastructure quality and income levels in Latin American countries, however, countries in Latin America have lower quality infrastructure relative to other countries with similar income levels. This causes a loss of competitiveness due to the quality of physical infrastructure has been a significant drag on economic growth.

Governments play an important role in encouraging infrastructure investment. In Latin America, there are sectoral planning institutions in place across the region, but many key attributes can be improved. The International Monetary Fund found that Latin America performs poorly in the availability of funding for infrastructure and the availability of multiyear budgeting frameworks.

Latin America invests roughly 3% of its GDP into infrastructure projects. The Financial Times suggests that infrastructure spending should be at least 6% for Latin America to reach its infrastructure goals. This can be done by promoting private sector participation. The Private sector also plays an active role in supplying infrastructure. Governments in Latin America do a poor job of encouraging private sector participation. Developing financial markets for infrastructure bonds and other financial products can help governments mobilize resources for infrastructure projects while limiting their exposure to currency risk.

While infrastructure in Latin America still has room to grow, there are encouraging signs for investment in Latin American infrastructure. In 2013, private equity firms invested more than $3.5 billion in energy, telecom, and supply chain development. Governments are still looking for small partnerships between the public and private sectors to reduce inadequacies in the trade dynamic. Panama has taken steps in the direction to integrate its physical infrastructure for supply chain capacity. Panama completed the expansion of the Panama Canal to accommodate larger ships that exceeded Panamax size. In 2014, Panama built the new Tocumen International Airport and the Colón Free Trade Zone are major mechanisms to enhance supply chains in Panama.

China has had ambitious infrastructure project plans in Latin America, including a railway line linking the Atlantic and Pacific regions of Colombia, and an even longer one from Brazil to Peru, but plans have not translated to completed projects. A Hong Kong-financed project with the government of Nicaragua has plans to construct the Nicaragua Interoceanic Grand Canal Project through Lake Nicaragua, the largest lake in Central America, to compete with the Panama Canal. The Hong Kong-based HKND group the sole concessionaire.

A major international highway, completed in 2012, has linked Brazil with Peru via the Interoceanic Highway. It has economic benefits, but it also opens up areas of Amazonia to environmental degradation. Brazil has also funded a major upgrade of the Cuba port of Mariel, Cuba to handle large container ships.

Transport in Latin America is basically carried out using the road mode, the most developed in the region. There is also a considerable infrastructure of ports and airports. The railway and fluvial sector, although it has potential, is usually treated in a secondary way.

Brazil has more than 1.7 million km of roads, of which 215,000 km are paved, and about 14,000 km are divided highways. The two most important highways in the country are BR-101 and BR-116. Argentina has more than 600,000 km of roads, of which about 70,000 km are paved, and about 2,500 km are divided highways. The three most important highways in the country are Route 9, Route 7 and Route 14. Colombia has about 210,000 km of roads, and about 2,300 km are divided highways. Chile has about 82,000 km of roads, 20,000 km of which are paved, and about 2,000 km are divided highways. The most important highway in the country is the Route 5 (Pan-American Highway) These 4 countries are the ones with the best road infrastructure and with the largest number of double-lane highways, in South America.

Due to the Andes Mountains, Amazon River and Amazon Forest, there have always been difficulties in implementing transcontinental or bioceanic highways. Practically the only route that existed was the one that connected Brazil to Buenos Aires, in Argentina and later to Santiago, in Chile. However, in recent years, with the combined effort of countries, new routes have started to emerge, such as Brazil-Peru (Interoceanic Highway), and a new highway between Brazil, Paraguay, northern Argentina and northern Chile (Bioceanic Corridor).

There are more than 2,000 airports in Brazil. The country has the second largest number of airports in the world, behind only the United States. São Paulo International Airport, located in the Metropolitan Region of São Paulo, is the largest and busiest in the country – the airport connects São Paulo to practically all major cities around the world. Brazil has 44 international airports, such as those in Rio de Janeiro, Brasília, Belo Horizonte, Porto Alegre, Florianópolis, Cuiabá, Salvador, Recife, Fortaleza, Belém and Manaus, among others. Argentina has important international airports such as Buenos Aires, Cordoba, Bariloche, Mendoza, Salta, Puerto Iguazú, Neuquén and Usuhaia, among others. Chile has important international airports such as Santiago, Antofagasta, Puerto Montt, Punta Arenas and Iquique, among others. Colombia has important international airports such as Bogotá, Medellín, Cartagena, Cali and Barranquilla, among others. Peru has important international airports such as Lima, Cuzco and Arequipa. Other important airports are those in the capitals of Uruguay (Montevideo), Paraguay (Asunción), Bolivia (La Paz) and Ecuador (Quito). The 10 busiest airports in South America in 2017 were: São Paulo-Guarulhos (Brazil), Bogotá (Colombia), São Paulo-Congonhas (Brazil), Santiago (Chile), Lima (Peru), Brasília (Brazil), Rio de Janeiro (Brazil), Buenos Aires-Aeroparque (Argentina), Buenos Aires-Ezeiza (Argentina), and Minas Gerais (Brazil).

There are 1,834 airports in Mexico, the third-largest number of airports by country in the world. The seven largest airports—which absorb 90% of air travel—are (in order of air traffic): Mexico City, Cancún, Guadalajara, Monterrey, Tijuana, Acapulco, and Puerto Vallarta. Considering all of Latin America, the 10 busiest airports in 2017 were: Mexico City (Mexico), São Paulo-Guarulhos (Brazil), Bogotá (Colombia), Cancún (Mexico), São Paulo-Congonhas (Brazil), Santiago ( Chile), Lima (Peru), Brasilia (Brazil), Rio de Janeiro (Brazil) and Tocumen (Panama).

About ports, Brazil has some of the busiest ports in South America, such as Port of Santos, Port of Rio de Janeiro, Port of Paranaguá, Port of Itajaí, Port of Rio Grande, Port of São Francisco do Sul and Suape Port. Argentina has ports such as Port of Buenos Aires and Port of Rosario. Chile has important ports in Valparaíso, Caldera, Mejillones, Antofagasta, Iquique, Arica and Puerto Montt. Colombia has important ports such as Buenaventura, Cartagena Container Terminal and Puerto Bolivar. Peru has important ports in Callao, Ilo and Matarani. The 15 busiest ports in South America are: Port of Santos (Brazil), Port of Bahia de Cartagena (Colombia), Callao (Peru), Guayaquil (Ecuador), Buenos Aires (Argentina), San Antonio (Chile), Buenaventura (Colombia), Itajaí (Brazil), Valparaíso (Chile), Montevideo (Uruguay), Paranaguá (Brazil), Rio Grande (Brazil), São Francisco do Sul (Brazil), Manaus (Brazil) and Coronel (Chile).

The four major seaports concentrating around 60% of the merchandise traffic in Mexico are Altamira and Veracruz in the Gulf of Mexico, and Manzanillo and Lázaro Cárdenas in the Pacific Ocean. Considering all of Latin America, the 10 largest ports in terms of movement are: Colon (Panama), Santos (Brazil), Manzanillo (Mexico), Bahia de Cartagena (Colombia), Pacifico (Panama), Callao (Peru), Guayaquil ( Ecuador), Buenos Aires (Argentina), San Antonio (Chile) and Buenaventura (Colombia).

The Brazilian railway network has an extension of about 30,000 kilometers. It's basically used for transporting ores. The Argentine rail network, with 47,000 km of tracks, was one of the largest in the world and continues to be the most extensive in Latin America. It came to have about 100,000 km of rails, but the lifting of tracks and the emphasis placed on motor transport gradually reduced it. It has four different trails and international connections with Paraguay, Bolivia, Chile, Brazil and Uruguay. Chile has almost 7,000 km of railways, with connections to Argentina, Bolivia and Peru. Colombia has only about 3,500 km of railways.

Among the main Brazilian waterways, two stand out: Hidrovia Tietê-Paraná (which has a length of 2,400 km, 1,600 on the Paraná River and 800 km on the Tietê River, draining agricultural production from the states of Mato Grosso, Mato Grosso do Sul, Goiás and part of Rondônia, Tocantins and Minas General) and Hidrovia do Solimões-Amazonas (it has two sections: Solimões, which extends from Tabatinga to Manaus, with approximately 1600 km, and Amazonas, which extends from Manaus to Belém, with 1650 km. Almost entirely passenger transport from the Amazon plain is done by this waterway, in addition to practically all cargo transportation that is directed to the major regional centers of Belém and Manaus). In Brazil, this transport is still underutilized: the most important waterway stretches, from an economic point of view, are found in the Southeast and South of the country. Its full use still depends on the construction of locks, major dredging works and, mainly, of ports that allow intermodal integration. In Argentina, the waterway network is made up of the La Plata, Paraná, Paraguay and Uruguay rivers. The main river ports are Zárate and Campana. The port of Buenos Aires is historically the first in individual importance, but the area known as Up-River, which stretches along 67 km of the Santa Fé portion of the Paraná River, brings together 17 ports that concentrate 50% of the total exports of the country.

 Energy 
Brazil

The Brazilian government has undertaken an ambitious program to reduce dependence on imported petroleum. Imports previously accounted for more than 70% of the country's oil needs but Brazil became self-sufficient in oil in 2006–2007. Brazil was the 10th largest oil producer in the world in 2019, with 2.8 million barrels / day. Production manages to supply the country's demand. In the beginning of 2020, in the production of oil and natural gas, the country exceeded 4 million barrels of oil equivalent per day, for the first time. In January this year, 3.168 million barrels of oil per day and 138.753 million cubic meters of natural gas were extracted.

Brazil is one of the main world producers of hydroelectric power. In 2019, Brazil had 217 hydroelectric plants in operation, with an installed capacity of 98,581 MW, 60.16% of the country's energy generation. In the total generation of electricity, in 2019 Brazil reached 170,000 megawatts of installed capacity, more than 75% from renewable sources (the majority, hydroelectric).IEMA (Instituto de Energia e Meio Ambiente),2016.Série TERMOELETRICIDADE EM FOCO: Uso de água em termoelétricas

In 2013, the Southeast Region used about 50% of the load of the National Integrated System (SIN), being the main energy consuming region in the country. The region's installed electricity generation capacity totaled almost 42,500 MW, which represented about a third of Brazil's generation capacity. The hydroelectric generation represented 58% of the region's installed capacity, with the remaining 42% corresponding basically to the thermoelectric generation. São Paulo accounted for 40% of this capacity; Minas Gerais by about 25%; Rio de Janeiro by 13.3%; and Espírito Santo accounted for the rest. The South Region owns the Itaipu Dam, which was the largest hydroelectric plant in the world for several years, until the inauguration of Three Gorges Dam in China. It remains the second largest operating hydroelectric in the world. Brazil is the co-owner of the Itaipu Plant with Paraguay: the dam is located on the Paraná River, located on the border between countries. It has an installed generation capacity of 14 GW for 20 generating units of 700 MW each. North Region has large hydroelectric plants, such as Belo Monte Dam and Tucuruí Dam, which produce much of the national energy. Brazil's hydroelectric potential has not yet been fully exploited, so the country still has the capacity to build several renewable energy plants in its territory.Power: World's biggest hydroelectric facility

 according to ONS, total installed capacity of wind power was 22 GW, with average capacity factor of 58%. While the world average wind production capacity factors is 24.7%, there are areas in Northern Brazil, specially in Bahia State, where some wind farms record with average capacity factors over 60%; the average capacity factor in the Northeast Region is 45% in the coast and 49% in the interior. In 2019, wind energy represented 9% of the energy generated in the country. In 2019, it was estimated that the country had an estimated wind power generation potential of around 522 GW (this, only onshore), enough energy to meet three times the country's current demand.Brazilian onshore wind potential could be 880 GW, study indicates In 2021 Brazil was the 7th country in the world in terms of installed wind power (21 GW), and the 4th largest producer of wind energy in the world (72 TWh), behind only China, USA and Germany.

Nuclear energy accounts for about 4% of Brazil's electricity. The nuclear power generation monopoly is owned by Eletronuclear (Eletrobrás Eletronuclear S/A), a wholly owned subsidiary of Eletrobrás. Nuclear energy is produced by two reactors at Angra. It is located at the Central Nuclear Almirante Álvaro Alberto (CNAAA) on the Praia de Itaorna in Angra dos Reis, Rio de Janeiro. It consists of two pressurized water reactors, Angra I, with capacity of 657 MW, connected to the power grid in 1982, and Angra II, with capacity of 1,350 MW, connected in 2000. A third reactor, Angra III, with a projected output of 1,350 MW, is planned to be finished.

 according to ONS, total installed capacity of photovoltaic solar was 21 GW, with average capacity factor of 23%. Some of the most irradiated Brazilian States are MG ("Minas Gerais"), BA ("Bahia") and GO (Goiás), which have indeed world irradiation level records. In 2019, solar power represented 1.27% of the energy generated in the country. In 2021, Brazil was the 14th country in the world in terms of installed solar power (13 GW), and the 11th largest producer of solar energy in the world (16.8 TWh).

In 2020, Brazil was the 2nd largest country in the world in the production of energy through biomass (energy production from solid biofuels and renewable waste), with 15,2 GW installed.

Other countries
After Brazil, Mexico is the country in Latin America that most stands out in energy production. In 2020, the country was the 14th largest petroleum producer in the world, and in 2018 it was the 12th largest exporter. In natural gas, the country was, in 2015, the 21st largest producer in the world, and in 2007 it was the 29th largest exporter. Mexico was also the world's 24th largest producer of coal in 2018. In renewable energies, in 2020, the country ranked 14th in the world in terms of installed wind energy (8.1 GW), 20th in the world in terms of installed solar energy (5.6 GW) and 19th in the world in terms of installed hydroelectric power (12.6 GW). In third place, Colombia stands out: In 2020, the country was the 20th largest petroleum producer in the world, and in 2015 it was the 19th largest exporter. In natural gas, the country was, in 2015, the 40th largest producer in the world. Colombia's biggest highlight is in coal, where the country was, in 2018, the world's 12th largest producer and the 5th largest exporter. In renewable energies, in 2020, the country ranked 45th in the world in terms of installed wind energy (0.5 GW), 76th in the world in terms of installed solar energy (0.1 GW) and 20th in the world in terms of installed hydroelectric power (12.6 GW). Venezuela, which was one of the world's largest oil producers (about 2.5 million barrels/day in 2015) and one of the largest exporters, due to its political problems, has had its production drastically reduced in recent years: in 2016, it dropped to 2.2 million, in 2017 to 2 million, in 2018 to 1.4 million and in 2019 to 877 thousand, reaching only 300,000 barrels/day at a given point. The country also stands out in hydroelectricity, where it was the 14th country in the world in terms of installed capacity in 2020 (16,5 GW). Argentina was, in 2017, the 18th largest producer in the world, and the largest producer in Latin America, of natural gas, in addition to being the 28th largest oil producer; although the country has the Vaca Muerta field, which holds close to 16 billion barrels of technically recoverable shale oil, and is the second largest shale natural gas deposit in the world, the country lacks the capacity to exploit the deposit: it is necessary capital, technology and knowledge that can only come from offshore energy companies, who view Argentina and its erratic economic policies with considerable suspicion, not wanting to invest in the country. In renewable energies, in 2020, the country ranked 27th in the world in terms of installed wind energy (2.6 GW), 42nd in the world in terms of installed solar energy (0.7 GW) and 21st in the world in terms of installed hydroelectric power (11.3 GW). The country has great future potential for the production of wind energy in the Patagonia region. Chile, although currently not a major energy producer, has great future potential for solar energy production in the Atacama Desert region. Paraguay stands out today in hydroelectric production thanks to the Itaipu Power Plant. Trinidad and Tobago and Bolivia stand out in the production of natural gas, where they were, respectively, the 20th and 31st largest in the world in 2015. Ecuador, because it consumes little energy, is part of OPEC and was the 27th largest oil producer in the world in 2020, being the 22nd largest exporter in 2014.IEA. Key World Energy Statistics 2014. Natural Gas. Access date - 01/17/2021Statistical Review of World Energy 2018

Main economies in the current era

Brazil

In 2016, Brazil's currency appreciated by 30% and their stock market, the Bovespa, returned 70%. Investors do not expect a similar rate of return in 2017 but they are expecting modest returns. The Ibovespa is the largest stock exchange in Latin America, so it is often used by investors to study investment trends in Latin America. The economy in Brazil is recovering from its most severe recession since it began tracking economic data. Following Dilma Rousseff's impeachment, Brazil is experiencing a period of political certainty and rising consumer and business confidence. Unemployment is expected to increase in 2017 and inflation will slowly return to its target range.

A 2016 report on Brazil's economy suggests that Brazil's fiscal stance is mildly contractionary which strikes a good balance between macroeconomic requirements and stability. This shows that the Brazilian government is committed to restoring the sustainability of public finance through a steady path. Fiscal adjustment will allow monetary policy to loosen and encourage foreign and domestic investment. Brazil's rising productivity depends on the strengthening of its competition, improvement of infrastructure, and fewer administrative barriers.

Brazilian president Michel Termer and former governor of the central bank, Henrique Meirelles, have proposed an overhaul of Brazil's economic governance. Under this plan, public spending, including the pension system, will be cut and regulations will be lifted, beginning in the oil and gas sector, which has suffered due to over leverage and corruption. Over the past 20 years, public spending has increased annually by 6%, which has grown the deficit to −2.3% of GDP for the year ending in April 2016. Prospects for the Brazilian economy have garnered hope among investors and entrepreneurs. The yield on the Brazilian bond has fallen from 17% in January 2016 to 13% in June 2016, showing confidence in Brazil's financial future.

Argentina

The OECD expects Economic growth in Argentina to increase in 2017 and 2018 due to recent economic reforms. In 2016, Argentina reformed the national statistics agency, causing an upgrade in Argentina's credibility. This enabled the central bank to increase interest rates, contain inflation, and respond to exchange rate pressures.

The latest inflation data shows that the inflation rate will stabilize at a 1.5% month over month, with expectations anchored at 20% YoY. Inflation in 2017 is set to slow down due to a restrictive monetary policy and stable exchange rate. 2016 has affirmed the credibility of the Argentine central bank and its transparency efforts. The government is seeking to adjust wages at the level of inflation while unions are seeking for adjustments past inflation targets.

In mid-2016, Argentina saw a low point of economic activity with weak first and second quarters and strong third and fourth quarters due to organized corruption, union labor breaking. The decline in GDP reached −3.4% in the second quarter of 2016. BBVA research expects improvements in the coming year for industrial activity oriented in foreign markets, driven by the recovery of Brazil. Household consumption began improving at the end of 2015 due to higher retirement income catalyzed by the implementation of the historical reparations program.

In 2015, Argentina's top exports were oil-cake, soya beans, crude soya bean oil, maize, and diesel powered trucks.

Colombia

Colombia has a strong export sector, with petroleum, coal, emeralds, coffee, and cut flowers the top commodities exported in 2015.

BBVA Research suggests that consumption and investment have undergone an adjustment and caused domestic demand to fall below total GDP. The economy is expected to grow at a rate of 2.4% in 2017.

Falling imports and lower profit repatriation caused the deficit to stand at 4.8% of the GDP at the end of 2016. This deficit is expected to stand at 3.8% of GDP in 2017. Current exchange rate levels will help the external deficit correct itself. In 2017, the Colombian Peso is expected to trade at 3,007 COP per 1 USD.

At the end of 2016, the Congress of Colombia approved a tax reform bill, with the goal of making public accounts more sustainable and replacing revenue that the government lost from the oil sector. This reform is expected to increase non-oil revenue by 0.8% of GDP in 2017 and will gradually increase in future years.

Recent economic data supports a slowdown of growth relative to previous estimates. This slow growth is occurring in all areas of domestic demand. Private consumption eased in line with a drop in consumer confidence and the slowdown was beyond the drop of spending in durable goods.

Mexico

Mexico's imports and exports reflect its membership in NAFTA, with significant trade with the U.S. and Canada. In 2015, the top export goods from Mexico were automobiles and trucks, petroleum, televisions, and digital processing units.

Scotiabank expects Mexico's economic growth to be largely influenced by the economic policy of the Trump Administration.Expectations of shifts in trade with the United States, immigration, and monetary policy have caused the Mexican currency markets to be volatile.

Mexico is a major producer of crude oil and natural gas. Mining is an important sector of the Mexican economy, with production of silver (world rank:1); fluorspar (world rank:2); strontium (world rank:3); bismuth (world rank:3); lead (world rank:5); cadmium (world rank:5); and zinc (world rank:7).

Tourism in Mexico is a major economic sector, with the 2017 Travel and Tourism Competitiveness Report placing Mexico at 22 of the top 30 tourist destinations in the world.

Chile

Growth in Chile's economy is projected to increase in 2017 and 2018 due to high demand for Chilean exports and an increase in investment and private consumption. In 2016, economic activity was driven by the services sector and dampened by mining and manufacturing.

An increase in unemployment is expected from 6.5% to 7.1%. The investment environment in Chile is expected to see a positive shift and will be realized by lower investments in mining, and a rebound in other sectors. Measures to increase productivity and investment will help diversify the economy and support sustainable growth. In 2016, inflation receded to 2.7%, 0.3% lower than the central bank's target.

Chile is most closely associated with the mining industry, though it is not the only important industry in Chile. An eighth of the working population is employed in this industry. Codelco is the world's biggest copper exporting company. In addition to copper, Chile also mines gold, silver, and cement materials. While Chilean administrations have been trying to diversify the economy, a strong mining industry has been the basis for financial stability.

Foreign investment
The European Investment Bank has invested in Latin America since 1993, backing 140 projects in 14 countries for more than €10.8 billion.

In 2020, the European Investment Bank provided €516 million in finance in Latin America and the Caribbean, contributing to sustainable and equitable development as well as climate action. All EIB loans in the area were made to public sector borrowers, mostly national development banks and a few new partners. In 2020 the European Investment Bank provided €462 million in Latin America, of which €278 million was due to the COVID-19 pandemic.

Brazil
Brazil has seen a slowdown in foreign investment after reaching a zenith of $64 billion of foreign investment in 2013. Despite its arcane law requiring foreign ivestors to deposit money with its Central Bank before being allowed to have a business operating, no government or multinational has protested this, fearing antagonizing the powers that be in Brazil. Brazil has yet to make public its investment laws on foreign investors seeking permanent Brazlian visas such as Chinese, Korean, and Japanese investors. Foreign investment in Brazil declined in 2016, however, Brazil is still the largest recipient of foreign investment in Latin America. Investors are attracted to Brazil because of its market of 210 million inhabitants, easy access to raw materials, and a strategic geographic position. The main investors in Brazil are the United States, Spain, and Belgium. With the impeachment of Dilma Rousseff and the embezzlement scandal behind them, Brazil is set to benefit from stronger commodity prices and attract more foreign investment. Brazil's top exports in 2015 were soya, petroleum, iron ore, raw cane sugar, and oil-cake.

In 2020, the European Investment Bank partnered with Mexican development banks (NAFIN) and Brazilian development banks (Banco do Nordeste do Brasil, or BNB) to assist micro-enterprises affected by the COVID-19 pandemic. The goals of the €200 million loan to Banco do Nordeste do Brasil are to promote women's empowerment in business while helping to alleviate poverty. Such a loan also assists in meeting the working capital and investment needs of Brazilian micro-enterprises affected by the COVID-19 pandemic in northeast Brazil, with a focus on the most vulnerable and low-income borrowers in the region.

BNB will give micro-entrepreneurs with short-term loans of less than €1000 through its Crediamigo program, with a special emphasis on funding for female-led firms. This operation adheres to the Bank's 2X challenge criteria, which are in accordance with the EIB Group Strategy on Gender Equality and Women's Economic Empowerment. Bank Ademi and Bank Adopem especially both adhere to the criteria, and assist women borrowers throughout Brazil.

Argentina
Argentina ranks fourth in South America in terms of foreign investment and sixth in terms of foreign investment influx. Argentina has access to natural resources (copper, oil, and gas) and a highly skilled workforce. In the past, Argentina has suffered from restrictions that were placed on foreign investment in agriculture, which is important for the country's food security. Santander Bank expects Argentina to receive an influx of foreign investment thanks to the favorable business environment set by President Mauricio Macri.

Colombia
The improving security environment in has restored investor sentiment in Colombia. This has caused a growth in foreign investments, mostly in mining and energy projects. Over the past 10 years, Bogotá has received 16.7 billion in direct foreign investment in financial services and communications, allowing it to emerge as a leading business center in Latin America. BBVA Continental expects investors in Colombia will also benefit from a strong legislative framework.

Mexico
Mexico is one of the world's main destinations for foreign investments (#10 in 2016), however, Mexico is also the country that will be most affected by protectionist U.S. trade policies. In recent years, investments in Mexico have been hampered by the growth of organized crime, corruption, and administrative inefficiencies. In 2014, the government planned new industrial centers which would require foreign investment. Additionally, the IMF reports that the exploitation of Mexico's Hydrocarbon reserves will require an annual investment of $40 billion from 2015 to 2019.

The European Investment Bank provided a $150 million loan to Nacional Financiera (NAFIN), one of Mexico's premier development banks, to help Mexican microenterprises dealing with the COVID-19 pandemic meet their operating capital and investment needs.

Chile
The influx of foreign investments in Chile has grown every year from 2010 to 2015. In terms of foreign investment, Chile is the region's second most attractive country, after Brazil, however, the investment cycle in Chile is variable because it is linked to mining projects. Chilean economics are founded on the principles of transparency and non-discrimination against foreign investors. Investors are attracted to Chile due to its natural resources, macroeconomic stability, security, and growth potential.

Regional risks

Currency risks
Over the past five years, dollar-based investors in Latin America have experienced losses driven by a depreciation of local exchange rates. Looking forward to 2017, several factors suggest that current exchange rates will provide positive tailwinds to dollar-based investors over the next several years.:
 Local currencies appear undervalued on a PPP basis: Latin American currencies are seeing an increase in purchasing power. Cheaper goods and services in Latin America will stimulate an appreciation in local currencies.
 Real exchange rates have declined enough to resolve current accounts deficits: Low currencies are resulting in a decreased demand for imported goods and stimulus for foreign demand for exports. Cheap exchange rates have set the stage for strong trade dynamics moving forward which should increase demand for Latin American currencies.
 Commodity prices are rising: Commodity prices are trading at 64% below their peak in 2007.
 Interest rate differentials are stimulating capital flows in Latin America: The monetary policies of central banks in the region are supportive of strong currency levels. Central banks have acted and raised interest rates to maintain price stability. With decreasing inflation, the real return differentials between the Dollar and Latin American currencies are attractive enough to carry trade into these local currencies and support appreciation.

Trade uncertainty
Potential import tariffs from the United States and limits on trade present significant risks for Latin American economies. Uneasiness over a United States' shift away from a free trade policy was manifested on November 9, 2016, where the Mexican Peso lost 15% of its value. The Economist warns that this knock on confidence will produce unwanted effects on the Mexican economy in the form of weak private consumption and foreign investment.

The context of potential U.S. policy shifts affecting trade will cause diplomatic relations between the United States and Latin America to be more volatile. Latin America stands to suffer from global economic repercussions of such as fluctuations in the stock and commodities market. Volatility in commodity prices, to which Latin American economies are highly exposed, could be a big shock to the Latin America's economic growth.

See also

 United Nations Economic Commission for Latin America and the Caribbean
 Central banks and currencies of the Americas
 Economy of Central America
 Economy of South America
 Economy of the Caribbean
 Environmental history of Latin America
 Latin American World Model
 List of banks in the Americas
 List of Latin American and Caribbean countries by GDP growth
 List of Latin American and Caribbean countries by GDP (nominal)
 List of Latin American and Caribbean countries by GDP (PPP)
 List of stock exchanges in the Americas

References

Further reading

 Bauer, Arnold J. Goods, Power, History: Latin America's Material Culture. New York: Cambridge University Press 2001.
 Bernecker, Walter L., and Hans Werner Tobler, eds. Development and Underdevelopment in America: Contrasts of Economic Growth in North and Latin America in Historical Perspective. Berlin 1993.
 Bethell, Leslie, ed. The Cambridge History of Latin America, vol. 6. Latin America Since 1930: Economy, Society, and Politics. New York: Cambridge University Press 1994.
 Bulmer-Thomas, Victor. The Economic History of Latin America Since Independence. Cambridge: Cambridge University Press 2003.
 Bulmer-Thomas, Victor, John H. Coatsworth, and Roberto Cortés Conde, eds. The Cambridge Economic History of Latin America. 2 vols. Cambridge: Cambridge University Press 2006.
 Bushnell, David and N. Macaulay. The Emergence of Latin America in the Nineteenth Century. New York: Oxford University Press 1994.
 Cárdenas, E., J.A. Ocampo, and Rosemary Thorp, eds. An Economic History of Twentieth-Century Latin America. London: Palgrave 2000.
 Cardoso, F.H. and E. Faletto. Dependency and Development in Latin America. Berkeley and Los Angeles: University of California Press 1979.
 Coatsworth, John H., "Obstacles to Economic Growth in Nineteenth-Century Mexico". American Historical Review 83: 1 (February 1978), pp. 80–100.
 Coatsworth, John H. Growth Against Development: The Economic Impact of Railroads in Porfirian Mexico. DeKalb: Northern Illinois University Press 1981.
 Coatsworth, John H. "Inequality, Institutions, and Economic Growth in Latin America," Journal of Latin American Studies 40 (2008): 545–69.
 Coatsworth, John H. and William R. Summerhill. "The New Economic History of Latin America: Evolution and Recent Contributions" in The Oxford Handbook of Latin American History, José Moya, ed. New York: Oxford University Press 2011, pp. 407–423.
 Coatsworth, John H. and Alan Taylor, eds. Latin America and the World Economy since 1800. Cambridge: Harvard University Press 1998.
 Cortés Conde, Roberto. The First Stages of Modernization in Spanish America. New York: Harper and Row 1974.
 Cortés Conde, Roberto. "Export-led Growth in Latin America: 1870–1930", Journal of Latin American Studies 24 (Quincentenary Supplement 1992), pp. 163–79.
 Cortés Conde, Roberto and Shane Hunt, eds. The Latin American Export Economies: Growth and the Export Sector, 1880–1930. 1985.
 ECLAC. Economic Survey of Latin America and the Caribbean 2018. Evolution of investment in Latin America and the Caribbean: stylized facts, determinants and policy challenges. Briefing paper. Economic Commission for Latin America and the Caribbean, 2018.
 ECLAC. Preliminary Overview of the Economies of Latin America and the Caribbean 2017. Economic Commission for Latin America and the Caribbean, 2018.
 Engerman, Stanley L. and Kenneth L. Sokoloff, "Factor Endowments, Institutions, and Differential Paths of Growth Among New World Economies" in How Latin America Fell Behind: Essays in the Economic Histories of Brazil and Mexico, 1800–1914. Stanford: Stanford University Press 1997, pp. 260–304.
 Gootenberg, Paul. "Between a Rock and a Softer Place: Reflections on Some Recent Economic History of Latin America" in Latin American Research Review 39:2 (2004): 239–57.
 Haber, Stephen H., ed. How Latin America Fell Behind: Essays in the Economic Histories of Brazil and Mexico, 1800–1914. Stanford: Stanford University Press 1997.
 Haber, Stephen H., ed. Political Institutions and Economic Growth in Latin America. Stanford: Stanford University Press 2000.
 Joslin, D. A Century of Banking in Latin America. London: Oxford University Press 1963.
 Lewis, Colin, "Industry in Latin America before 1930" in Leslie Bethell, ed. The Cambridge History of Latin America, vol. 4 c 1870–1930. New York: Cambridge University Press 1986.
 Lockhart, James and Stuart B. Schwartz. Early Latin America. New York: Cambridge University Press 1983.
 Ocampo, José Antonio and Rosemary Thorp. eds. The Export Age: The Latin American Economies in the Nineteenth and Early Twentieth Centuries. Basingstoke 2001.
 Prados de la Escosura, Leandro. "Lost Decades? Economic Performance in Post-Independence Latin America," Journal of Latin American Studies 41 (2209): 279–307.
 Thorp, Rosemary. Progress, Poverty, and Exclusion: An Economic History of Latin America in the Twentieth Century. Baltimore: IDB 1998.
 Thorp, Rosemary, ed. Latin America in the 1930s: The Role of the Periphery in the World Crisis. London: Macmillan 1984.
 Topik, Steven, Carlos Marichal, and Zephyr Frank, eds. From Silver to Cocaine: Latin American Commodity Chains and the Building of the World Economy''. Durham: Duke University Press 2006,

Commodity booms
Economies by region
Latin America